= History of Maxwell's equations =

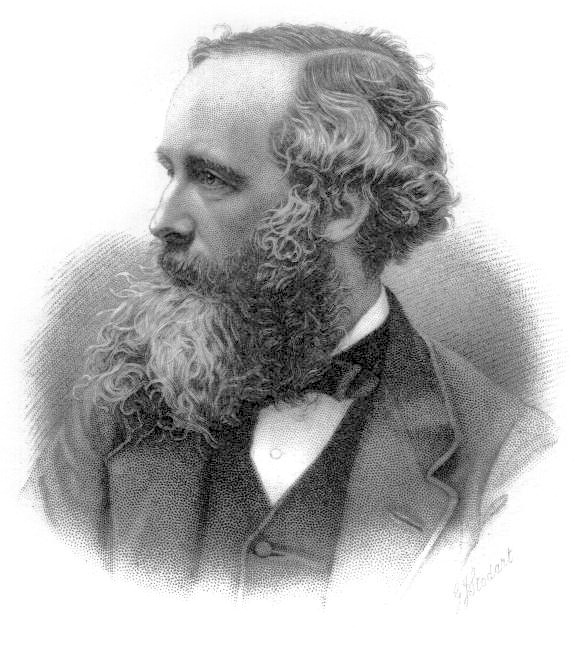
James Clerk Maxwell

By the first half of the 19th century, the understanding of electromagnetics had improved through many experiments and theoretical work. In the 1780s, Charles-Augustin de Coulomb established his law of electrostatics. In 1825, André-Marie Ampère published his force law. In 1831, Michael Faraday discovered electromagnetic induction through his experiments, and proposed lines of forces to describe it. In 1834, Emil Lenz solved the problem of the direction of the induction, and Franz Ernst Neumann wrote down the equation to calculate the induced force by change of magnetic flux. However, these experimental results and rules were not well organized and sometimes confusing to scientists. A comprehensive summary of the electrodynamic principles was needed.

This work was done by the Scottish physicist and mathematician James Clerk Maxwell through a series of papers published from the 1850s to the 1870s. In the 1850s, Maxwell was working at the University of Cambridge where he was impressed by Faraday's lines of forces concept. In 1856, he published his first paper in electromagnetism: On Faraday's Lines of Force. He tried to use the analogy of incompressible fluid flow to model the magnetic lines of forces. Later, Maxwell moved to King's College London where he actually came into regular contact with Faraday, and became life-long friends. From 1861 to 1862, Maxwell published a series of four papers under the title of On Physical Lines of Force. In these papers, he used mechanical models, such as rotating vortex tubes, to model the electromagnetic field. He also modeled the vacuum as a kind of insulating elastic medium to account for the stress of the magnetic lines of force given by Faraday. These works had already laid the basis of the formulation of the Maxwell's equations. Moreover, the 1862 paper already derived the speed of light c from the expression of the velocity of the electromagnetic wave in relation to the vacuum constants. The final form of Maxwell's equations was published in 1865 A Dynamical Theory of the Electromagnetic Field, in which the theory is formulated in strictly mathematical form. In 1873, Maxwell published A Treatise on Electricity and Magnetism as a summary of his work on electromagnetism. In summary, Maxwell's equations successfully unified theories of light and electromagnetism, which is one of the great unifications in physics.

Maxwell built a simple flywheel model of electromagnetism, and Ludwig Boltzmann built an elaborate mechanical model ("Bicykel") based on Maxwell's flywheel model, which he used for lecture demonstrations. Figures are at the end of Boltzmann's 1891 book.

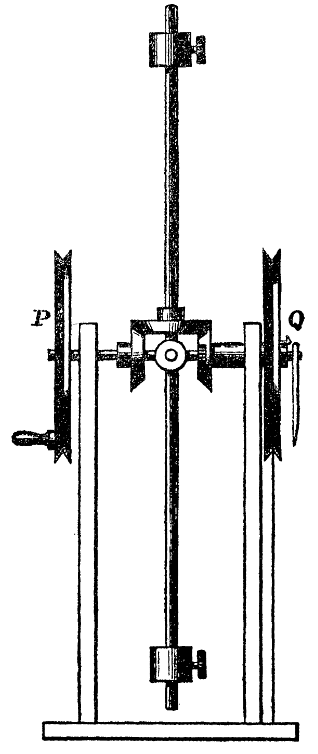
Maxwell's differential gear model for induction. Flywheels P and Q represent the primary and secondary circuits. An increase of the moment of inertia of the flywheel in the middle illustrates the effect of placing an iron core between the two circuits.

Later, Oliver Heaviside studied Maxwell's A Treatise on Electricity and Magnetism and employed vector calculus to synthesize Maxwell's over 20 equations into the four recognizable ones which modern physicists use. Maxwell's equations also inspired Albert Einstein in developing the theory of special relativity.

The experimental proof of Maxwell's equations was demonstrated by Heinrich Hertz in a series of experiments in the 1890s. After that, Maxwell's equations were fully accepted by scientists.

== Relationships among electricity, magnetism, and the speed of light ==
The relationships amongst electricity, magnetism, and the speed of light can be summarized by the modern equation:

$$c = \frac{1}{\sqrt{\mu_0 \varepsilon_0}} \ .$$

The left-hand side is the speed of light and the right-hand side is a quantity related to the constants that appear in the equations governing electricity and magnetism. Although the right-hand side has units of velocity, it can be inferred from measurements of electric and magnetic forces, which involve no physical velocities. Therefore, establishing this relationship provided convincing evidence that light is an electromagnetic phenomenon.

The discovery of this relationship started in 1855, when Wilhelm Eduard Weber and Rudolf Kohlrausch determined that there was a quantity related to electricity and magnetism, "the ratio of the absolute electromagnetic unit of charge to the absolute electrostatic unit of charge" (in modern language, the value $1/\sqrt{\mu_0 \varepsilon_0}$), and determined that it should have units of velocity. They then measured this ratio by an experiment which involved charging and discharging a Leyden jar and measuring the magnetic force from the discharge current, and found a value 3.107×10^{8} m/s, remarkably close to the speed of light, which had recently been measured at 3.14×10^{8} m/s by Hippolyte Fizeau in 1848 and at 2.98×10^{8} m/s by Léon Foucault in 1850. However, Weber and Kohlrausch did not make the connection to the speed of light. Towards the end of 1861 while working on Part III of his paper On Physical Lines of Force, Maxwell travelled from Scotland to London and looked up Weber and Kohlrausch's results. He converted them into a format which was compatible with his own writings, and in doing so he established the connection to the speed of light and concluded that light is a form of electromagnetic radiation.

== The term Maxwell's equations ==
The four modern Maxwell's equations can be found individually throughout his 1861 paper, derived theoretically using a molecular vortex model of Michael Faraday's "lines of force" and in conjunction with the experimental result of Weber and Kohlrausch. But it was not until 1884 that Oliver Heaviside, concurrently with similar work by Josiah Willard Gibbs and Heinrich Hertz, grouped the twenty equations together into a set of only four, via vector notation. This group of four equations was known variously as the Hertz–Heaviside equations and the Maxwell–Hertz equations, but are now universally known as Maxwell's equations. Heaviside's equations, which are taught in textbooks and universities as Maxwell's equations are not exactly the same as the ones due to Maxwell, and, in fact, the latter are more easily made to conform to quantum physics.

This very subtle and paradoxical sounding situation can perhaps be most easily understood in terms of the similar situation that exists with respect to Newton's second law of motion: In textbooks and in classrooms the law $F=ma$ is attributed to Newton, but Newton in fact wrote his second law as $F=\dot{p}$. This is clearly visible in a glass case in the Wren Library of Trinity College, Cambridge, where Newton's manuscript is open to the relevant page, showing the equation $F=\dot{p}$, where $\dot{p}$ is the time derivative of the momentum $p$. This seems a trivial enough fact until you realize that $F=\dot{p}$ remains true in special relativity, without modification.

Maxwell's contribution to science in producing these equations lies in the correction he made to Ampère's circuital law in his 1861 paper On Physical Lines of Force. He added the displacement current term to Ampère's circuital law and this enabled him to derive the electromagnetic wave equation in his later 1865 paper A Dynamical Theory of the Electromagnetic Field and to demonstrate the fact that light is an electromagnetic wave. This fact was later confirmed experimentally by Heinrich Hertz in 1887. The physicist Richard Feynman predicted that, "From a long view of the history of mankind, seen from, say, ten thousand years from now, there can be little doubt that the most significant event of the 19th century will be judged as Maxwell's discovery of the laws of electrodynamics. The American Civil War will pale into provincial insignificance in comparison with this important scientific event of the same decade."

The concept of fields was introduced by, among others, Faraday. Albert Einstein wrote:

The precise formulation of the time-space laws was the work of Maxwell. Imagine his feelings when the differential equations he had formulated proved to him that electromagnetic fields spread in the form of polarized waves, and at the speed of light! To few men in the world has such an experience been vouchsafed ... it took physicists some decades to grasp the full significance of Maxwell's discovery, so bold was the leap that his genius forced upon the conceptions of his fellow workers.

— Einstein (Science, 24 May 1940)

Heaviside worked to eliminate the potentials (electric potential and magnetic potential) that Maxwell had used as the central concepts in his equations; (Note: The re-formulated equations published by Heaviside are now universally known as Maxwell's equations; for example, A. Einstein called them Maxwell's equations in Einstein, A. (24 May 1940). "The Fundamentals of Theoretical Physics". Science. 91 (2369): 487–492. doi:10.1126/science.91.2369.487. PMID 17847438. cited in.) this effort was somewhat controversial, though it was understood by 1884 that the potentials must propagate at the speed of light like the fields, unlike the concept of instantaneous action-at-a-distance like the then conception of gravitational potential.

== On Physical Lines of Force ==
The four equations we use today appeared separately in Maxwell's 1861 paper, On Physical Lines of Force:

1. Equation (56) in Maxwell's 1861 paper is Gauss's law for magnetism, ∇ • B = 0.
2. Equation (112) is Ampère's circuital law, with Maxwell's addition of displacement current. This may be the most remarkable contribution of Maxwell's work, enabling him to derive the electromagnetic wave equation in his 1865 paper A Dynamical Theory of the Electromagnetic Field, showing that light is an electromagnetic wave. This lent the equations their full significance with respect to understanding the nature of the phenomena he elucidated. (Kirchhoff derived the telegrapher's equations in 1857 without using displacement current, but he did use Poisson's equation and the equation of continuity, which are the mathematical ingredients of the displacement current. Nevertheless, believing his equations to be applicable only inside an electric wire, he cannot be credited with the discovery that light is an electromagnetic wave).
3. Equation (115) is Gauss's law.
4. Equation (54) expresses what Oliver Heaviside referred to as 'Faraday's law', which addresses the time-variant aspect of electromagnetic induction, but not the one induced by motion; Faraday's original flux law accounted for both. Maxwell deals with the motion-related aspect of electromagnetic induction, v × B, in equation (77), which is the same as equation (D) in Maxwell's original equations as listed below. It is expressed today as the force law equation, F = q(E + v × B), which sits adjacent to Maxwell's equations and bears the name Lorentz force, even though Maxwell derived it when Lorentz was still a young boy.

The difference between the B and the H vectors can be traced back to Maxwell's 1855 paper entitled On Faraday's Lines of Force which was read to the Cambridge Philosophical Society. The paper presented a simplified model of Faraday's work, and how the two phenomena were related. He reduced all of the current knowledge into a linked set of differential equations.

Figure of Maxwell's molecular vortex model. For a uniform magnetic field, the field lines point outward from the display screen, as can be observed from the black dots in the middle of the hexagons. The vortex of each hexagonal molecule rotates counter-clockwise. The small green circles are clockwise rotating particles sandwiched between the molecular vortices.

It is later clarified in his concept of a sea of molecular vortices that appears in his 1861 paper On Physical Lines of Force. Within that context, H represented pure vorticity (spin), whereas B was a weighted vorticity that was weighted for the density of the vortex sea. Maxwell considered magnetic permeability µ to be a measure of the density of the vortex sea. Hence the relationship,

1. Magnetic induction current causes a magnetic current density B = μ H was essentially a rotational analogy to the linear electric current relationship,
2. Electric convection current J = ρ v where ρ is electric charge density. B was seen as a kind of magnetic current of vortices aligned in their axial planes, with H being the circumferential velocity of the vortices. With µ representing vortex density, it follows that the product of µ with vorticity H leads to the magnetic field denoted as B.

The electric current equation can be viewed as a convective current of electric charge that involves linear motion. By analogy, the magnetic equation is an inductive current involving spin. There is no linear motion in the inductive current along the direction of the B vector. The magnetic inductive current represents lines of force. In particular, it represents lines of inverse-square law force.

The extension of the above considerations confirms that where B is to H, and where J is to ρ, then it necessarily follows from Gauss's law and from the equation of continuity of charge that E is to D i.e. B parallels with E, whereas H parallels with D.

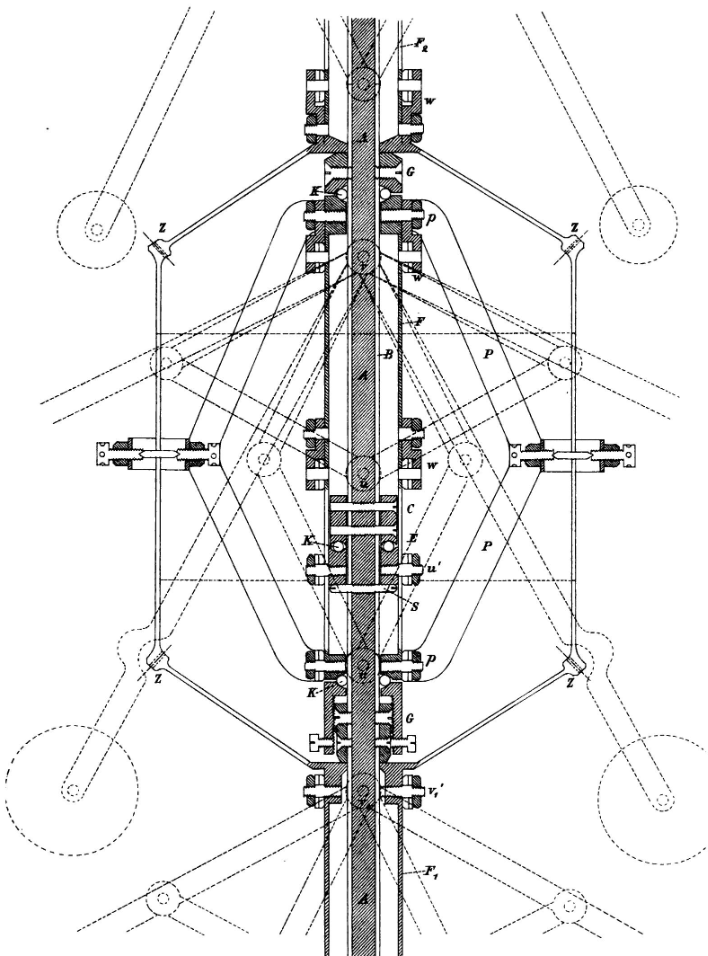
Engineering diagram of Boltzmann's Bicykel.

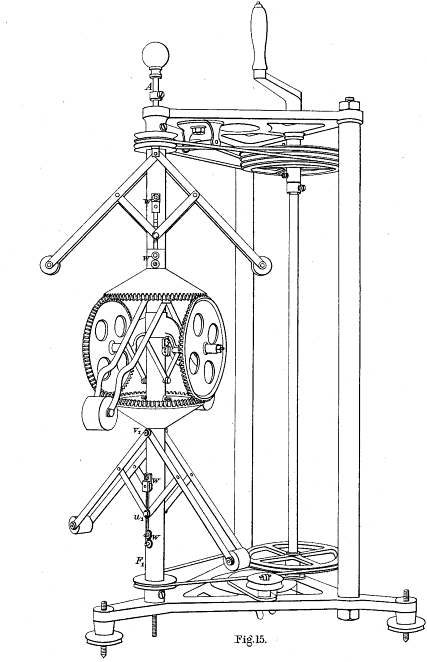
Boltzmann's Bicykel model of electromagnetic induction. It is a more complicated model than Maxwell's, to model further details of induction.

== A Dynamical Theory of the Electromagnetic Field ==
In 1865 Maxwell published "A dynamical theory of the electromagnetic field" in which he showed that light was an electromagnetic phenomenon. Confusion over the term "Maxwell's equations" sometimes arises because it has been used for a set of eight equations that appeared in Part III of Maxwell's 1865 paper "A dynamical theory of the electromagnetic field", entitled "General equations of the electromagnetic field", and this confusion is compounded by the writing of six of those eight equations as three separate equations (one for each of the Cartesian axes), resulting in twenty equations and twenty unknowns. (Note: As noted above, this terminology is not common: Modern use of the term "Maxwell's equations" refer to the Heaviside reformulation.)

The eight original Maxwell's equations can be written in the modern form of Heaviside's vector notation as follows:

[A] The law of total currents	$\mathbf{J}_\mathrm{tot} = \mathbf{J} + \frac{\partial\mathbf{D}}{\partial t}$
[B] The equation of magnetic force	$\mu \mathbf{H} = \nabla \times \mathbf{A}$
[C] Ampère's circuital law	$\nabla \times \mathbf{H} = \mathbf{J}_\mathrm{tot}$
[D] Electromotive force created by convection, induction, and by static electricity. (This is in effect the Lorentz force)	$\mathbf{E} = \mu \mathbf{v} \times \mathbf{H} - \frac{\partial\mathbf{A}}{\partial t}-\nabla \phi$
[E] The electric elasticity equation	$\mathbf{E} = \frac{1}{\varepsilon} \mathbf{D}$
[F] Ohm's law	$\mathbf{E} = \frac{1}{\sigma} \mathbf{J}$
[G] Gauss's law	$\nabla \cdot \mathbf{D} = \rho$
[H] Equation of continuity	$\nabla \cdot \mathbf{J} = -\frac{\partial\rho}{\partial t}$ or $\nabla \cdot \mathbf{J}_\mathrm{tot} = 0$

Notation
H is the magnetizing field, which Maxwell called the magnetic intensity.
J is the current density (with J_{tot} being the total current including displacement current). (Note: Here it is noted that a quite different quantity, the magnetic polarization, μ_{0}M by decision of an international IUPAP commission has been given the same name J. So for the electric current density, a name with small letters, j would be better. But even then the mathematicians would still use the large-letter name J for the corresponding current two-form (see below).)
D is the displacement field (called the electric displacement by Maxwell).
ρ is the free charge density (called the quantity of free electricity by Maxwell).
A is the magnetic potential (called the angular impulse by Maxwell).
E is called the electromotive force by Maxwell. The term electromotive force is nowadays used for voltage, but it is clear from the context that Maxwell's meaning corresponded more to the modern term electric field.
ϕ is the electric potential (which Maxwell also called electric potential).
σ is the electrical conductivity (Maxwell called the inverse of conductivity the specific resistance, what is now called the resistivity).

Equation [D], with the μv × H term, is effectively the Lorentz force, similarly to equation (77) of his 1861 paper (see above).

When Maxwell derives the electromagnetic wave equation in his 1865 paper, he uses equation [D] to cater for electromagnetic induction rather than Faraday's law of induction which is used in modern textbooks. (Faraday's law itself does not appear among his equations.) However, Maxwell drops the μ v × H term from equation [D] when he is deriving the electromagnetic wave equation, as he considers the situation only from the rest frame.

== A Treatise on Electricity and Magnetism ==
In A Treatise on Electricity and Magnetism, an 1873 treatise on electromagnetism written by James Clerk Maxwell, twelve general equations of the electromagnetic field are listed and these include the eight that are listed in the 1865 paper. His theoretical investigations of the electromagnetic field was guided by the notions of work, energy, potential, the principle of conservation of energy, and Lagrangian dynamics. All the principal equations concerning Maxwell's electromagnetic theory are recapitulated in Chapter IX of Part IV. At the end of this chapter, all the equations are listed and set in quaternion form. The first two equations [A] and [B] relates the electric scalar potential and magnetic vector potential to the electric and magnetic fields. The third equation [C] relates the electromagnetic field to electromagnetic force. The rest of the equations [D] to [L] relates the electromagnetic field to material data: the current and charge densities as well as the material medium.

Here the twelve Maxwell's equations have been given, respecting the original notations used by Maxwell. The only difference is that the vectors have been denoted using bold typeface instead of the original Fraktur typeface. For comparison Maxwell's equations in their original quaternion form and their vector form have been given. The $S.$ and $V.$ notations are used to denote the scalar and vector parts of quaternion product.

Name	Quaternion Form	Vector Form
[A] Magnetic induction	$\mathbf{B} = V. \nabla \mathbf{A}$; $S. \nabla \mathbf{A} = 0$	$\mathbf{B} = \nabla \times \mathbf{A}$; $\nabla \cdot \mathbf{A} = 0$
[B] Electromotive force	$\mathbf{E} = V. \mathbf{G} \mathbf{B} - \dot{\mathbf{A}} - \nabla \Psi$	$\mathbf{E} = \mathbf{G} \times \mathbf{B} - \dot{\mathbf{A}} - \nabla \Psi$
[C] Mechanical force	$\mathbf{F} = V. \mathbf{C} \mathbf{B} + e \mathbf{E} - m \nabla \Omega$	$\mathbf{F} = \mathbf{C} \times \mathbf{B} + e \mathbf{E} - m \nabla \Omega$
[D] Magnetization	$\mathbf{B} = \mathbf{H} + 4 \pi \mathbf{J}$	$\mathbf{B} = \mathbf{H} + 4 \pi \mathbf{J}$
[E] Electric currents	$4 \pi \mathbf{C} = V. \nabla \mathbf{H}$	$4 \pi \mathbf{C} = \nabla \times \mathbf{H}$
[F] Ohm's law	$\mathbf{K} = C \mathbf{E}$	$\mathbf{K} = C \mathbf{E}$
[G] Electric displacement	$\mathbf{D} = \frac{1}{4\pi} K \mathbf{E}$	$\mathbf{D} = \frac{1}{4\pi} K \mathbf{E}$
[H] Total current	$\mathbf{C} = \mathbf{K} + \dot{\mathbf{D}}$	$\mathbf{C} = \mathbf{K} + \dot{\mathbf{D}}$
[I] When magnetization arises from magnetic induction	$\mathbf{B} = \mu \mathbf{H}$	$\mathbf{B} = \mu \mathbf{H}$
[J] Electric volume density	$e = S. \nabla \mathbf{D}$	$e = \nabla \cdot \mathbf{D}$
[K] Magnetic volume density	$m = S. \nabla \mathbf{J}$	$m = \nabla \cdot \mathbf{J}$
[L] When magnetic force can be derived from a potential	$\mathbf{H} = - \nabla \Omega$	$\mathbf{H} = - \nabla \Omega$

Unfamiliar notation
G is the velocity of a point.
C is total current.
J is the intensity of magnetization.
K is the current of conduction.
Ψ is the electric potential.
Ω is the magnetic potential.
K is the dielectric constant.
C is electrical conductivity.
e is electric charge density.
m is magnetic charge density.

In the same chapter, Maxwell points out that the consequence of equation [A] is (in vector notation) $\nabla \cdot \mathbf{B} = 0$. Similarly, taking divergence of equation [E] gives conservation of electric charge, $\nabla \cdot \mathbf{C} = 0$, which, Maxwell points out, is true only if the total current includes the variation of electric displacement. Lastly, combining equation [A] and equation [E], the formula $\nabla^2 \mathbf{A} = 4 \pi \mu \mathbf{C}$ is obtained which relates magnetic potential with current. Elsewhere in the Part I of the book, the electric potential is related to charge density as $\nabla^2 \Psi = - \frac{4 \pi}{K} e$ in the absence of motion. Presciently, Maxwell also mentions that although some of the equations could be combined to eliminate some quantities, the objective of his list was to express every relation of which there was any knowledge of, rather than to obtain compactness of mathematical formulae.

== Relativity ==
Maxwell's equations were an essential inspiration for the development of special relativity. Possibly the most important aspect was their denial of instantaneous action at a distance. Rather, according to them, forces are propagated at the velocity of light through the electromagnetic field.

Maxwell's original equations are based on the idea that light travels through a sea of molecular vortices known as the "luminiferous aether", and that the speed of light has to be respective to the reference frame of this aether. Measurements designed to measure the speed of the Earth through the aether conflicted with this notion, though. (Note: Experiments like the Michelson–Morley experiment in 1887 failed to show that the aether moved against the Earth. While other experiments, such as measurements of the aberration of light from the stars, seemed to show that the aether is moving relative to the Earth.)

A more theoretical approach was suggested by Hendrik Lorentz along with George FitzGerald and Joseph Larmor. Both Larmor (1897) and Lorentz (1899, 1904) ignored aether motion and derived the Lorentz transformation (so named by Henri Poincaré) as one under which Maxwell's equations were invariant. Poincaré (1900) analyzed the coordination of moving clocks by exchanging light signals. He also established the mathematical group property of the Lorentz transformation (Poincaré 1905). Sometimes this transformation is called the FitzGerald–Lorentz transformation or even the FitzGerald–Lorentz–Einstein transformation.

Albert Einstein also dismissed the notion of the aether, and relied on Lorentz's conclusion about the fixed speed of light, independent of the velocity of the observer. He applied the FitzGerald–Lorentz transformation to kinematics, and not just Maxwell's equations. Maxwell's equations played a key role in Einstein's groundbreaking 1905 scientific paper on special relativity. For example, in the opening paragraph of his paper, he began his theory by noting that a description of an electric conductor moving with respect to a magnet must generate a consistent set of fields regardless of whether the force is calculated in the rest frame of the magnet or that of the conductor.

The general theory of relativity has also had a close relationship with Maxwell's equations. For example, Theodor Kaluza and Oskar Klein in the 1920s showed that Maxwell's equations could be derived by extending general relativity into five physical dimensions. This strategy of using additional dimensions to unify different forces remains an active area of research in physics.

== See also ==
- Classical electromagnetism and special relativity
- History of electromagnetic theory
- The Maxwellians
