= A Dynamical Theory of the Electromagnetic Field =

1865 physics paper by James Maxwell

"A Dynamical Theory of the Electromagnetic Field" is a paper by James Clerk Maxwell on electromagnetism, published in 1865. Physicist Freeman Dyson called the publishing of the paper the "most important event of the nineteenth century in the history of the physical sciences".

The paper was key in establishing the classical theory of electromagnetism. Maxwell derives an electromagnetic wave equation with a velocity for light in close agreement with measurements made by experiment, and also deduces that light is an electromagnetic wave.

== Publication ==
Following standard procedure for the time, the paper was first read to the Royal Society on 8 December 1864, having been sent by Maxwell to the society on 27 October. It then underwent peer review, being sent to William Thomson (later Lord Kelvin) on 24 December 1864. It was then sent to George Gabriel Stokes, the Society's physical sciences secretary, on 23 March 1865. It was approved for publication in the Philosophical Transactions of the Royal Society on 15 June 1865, by the Committee of Papers (essentially the society's governing council) and sent to the printer the following day (16 June). During this period, Philosophical Transactions was only published as a bound volume once a year, and would have been prepared for the society's anniversary day on 30 November (the exact date is not recorded). However, the printer would have prepared and delivered to Maxwell offprints, for the author to distribute as he wished, soon after 16 June.

== Maxwell's original equations ==
In part III of the paper, which is entitled "General Equations of the Electromagnetic Field", Maxwell formulated twenty equations which were to become known as Maxwell's equations, until this term became applied instead to a vectorized set of four equations selected in 1884, which had all appeared in his 1861 paper "On Physical Lines of Force".

Heaviside's versions of Maxwell's equations are distinct by virtue of the fact that they are written in modern vector notation. They actually only contain one of the original eight—equation "G" (Gauss's law). Another of Heaviside's four equations is an amalgamation of Maxwell's law of total currents (equation "A") with Ampère's circuital law (equation "C"). This amalgamation, which Maxwell himself had actually originally made at equation (112) in "On Physical Lines of Force", is the one that modifies Ampère's Circuital Law to include Maxwell's displacement current.

=== Heaviside's equations ===
Eighteen of Maxwell's twenty original equations can be vectorized into six equations, labeled (A) to (F) below, each of which represents a group of three original equations in component form. The 19th and 20th of Maxwell's component equations appear as (G) and (H) below, making a total of eight vector equations. These are listed below in Maxwell's original order, designated by the letters that Maxwell assigned to them in his 1865 paper.

(A) The law of total currents

$\mathbf{J}_{\rm tot} =$ $\,\mathbf{J}$ $+\,\frac{\partial\mathbf{D}}{\partial t}$

(B) Definition of the magnetic potential

$\mu \mathbf{H} = \nabla \times \mathbf{A}$

(C) Ampère's circuital law

$\nabla \times \mathbf{H} = \mathbf{J}_{\rm tot}$

(D) The Lorentz force and Faraday's law of induction

$\mathbf{f} = \mu (\mathbf{v} \times \mathbf{H}) - \frac{\partial\mathbf{A}}{\partial t}-\nabla \phi$

(E) The electric elasticity equation

$\mathbf{f} = \frac{1}{\varepsilon} \mathbf{D}$

(F) Ohm's law

$\mathbf{f} = \frac{1}{\sigma} \mathbf{J}$

(G) Gauss's law

$\nabla \cdot \mathbf{D} = \rho$

(H) Equation of continuity of charge

$\nabla \cdot \mathbf{J} = -\frac{\partial\rho}{\partial t}\,$.

Notation

$\mathbf{H}$ is the magnetic field, which Maxwell called the "magnetic intensity".
$\mathbf{J}$ is the electric current density (with $\mathbf{J}_{\rm tot}$ being the total current density including displacement current).
$\mathbf{D}$ is the displacement field (called the "electric displacement" by Maxwell).
$\rho$ is the free charge density (called the "quantity of free electricity" by Maxwell).
$\mathbf{A}$ is the magnetic potential (called the "angular impulse" by Maxwell).
$\mathbf{f}$ is the force per unit charge (called the "electromotive force" by Maxwell, not to be confused with the scalar quantity that is now called electromotive force; see below).
$\phi$ is the electric potential (which Maxwell also called "electric potential").
$\sigma$ is the electrical conductivity (Maxwell called the inverse of conductivity the "specific resistance", what is now called the resistivity).
$\nabla$ is the vector operator del.

Clarifications

Maxwell did not consider completely general materials; his initial formulation used linear, isotropic, nondispersive media with permittivity ϵ and permeability μ, although he also discussed the possibility of anisotropic materials.

Gauss's law for magnetism (∇⋅ B = 0) is not included in the above list, but follows directly from equation (B) by taking divergences (because the divergence of the curl is zero).

Substituting (A) into (C) yields the familiar differential form of the Maxwell-Ampère law.

Equation (D) implicitly contains the Lorentz force law and the differential form of Faraday's law of induction. For a static magnetic field, $\partial\mathbf{A}/\partial t$ vanishes, and the electric field E becomes conservative and is given by −∇ϕ, so that (D) reduces to

$\mathbf{f}=\mathbf{E}+\mathbf{v}\times\mathbf{B}\,$.

This is simply the Lorentz force law on a per-unit-charge basis — although Maxwell's equation (D) first appeared at equation (77) in "On Physical Lines of Force" in 1861, 34 years before Lorentz derived his force law, which is now usually presented as a supplement to the four "Maxwell's equations". The cross-product term in the Lorentz force law is the source of the so-called Motional EMF in electric generators (see also Moving magnet and conductor problem). Where there is no motion through the magnetic field — e.g., in transformers — we can drop the cross-product term, and the force per unit charge (called f) reduces to the electric field E, so that Maxwell's equation (D) reduces to

$\mathbf{E}=-\frac{\partial\mathbf{A}}{\partial t}-\nabla\phi\,$.

Taking curls, noting that the curl of a gradient is zero, we obtain

$\nabla\times\mathbf{E}\,=\,-\nabla\times\frac{\partial\mathbf{A}}{\partial t}\,=\,-\frac{\partial}{\partial t}\big(\nabla\times\mathbf{A}\big)\,=\,-\frac{\partial\mathbf{B}}{\partial t}\,,$

which is the differential form of Faraday's law. Thus the three terms on the right side of equation (D) may be described, from left to right, as the motional term, the transformer term, and the conservative term.

In deriving the electromagnetic wave equation, Maxwell considers the situation only from the rest frame of the medium, and accordingly drops the cross-product term. But he still works from equation (D), in contrast to modern textbooks which tend to work from Faraday's law (see below).

The constitutive equations (E) and (F) are now usually written in the rest frame of the medium as D = ϵE and J = σE.

Maxwell's equation (G), as printed in the 1865 paper, requires his e to mean minus the charge density (if his f, g, h are the components of D), whereas his equation (H) requires his e to mean plus the charge density (if his p, q, r are the components of J). John W. Arthur concludes that the sign of e in (G) is wrong, and observes that this sign is corrected in Maxwell's subsequent Treatise. Arthur speculates that the sign confusion may have arisen from the analogy between momentum and the magnetic vector potential (Maxwell's "electromagnetic momentum"), in which positive mass corresponds to negative charge. Arthur also lists some corresponding equations from Maxwell's earlier paper of 1861-2, and notes that the signs do not always match the later ones. The earlier signs (1861-2) are correct if F, G, H are the components of −A while f, g, h are the components of −D.

== Maxwell – electromagnetic light wave ==
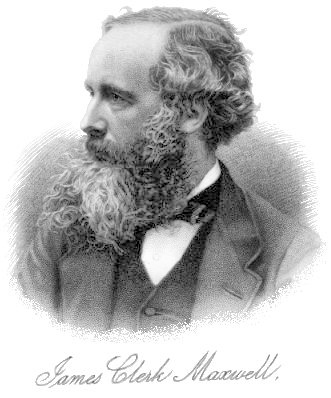
Father of Electromagnetic Theory

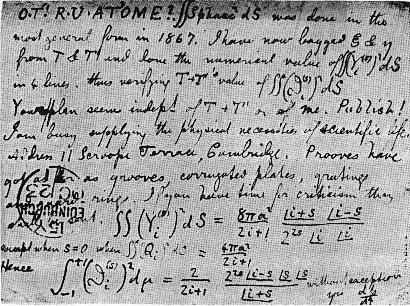
A postcard from Maxwell to Peter Tait

In part VI of "A Dynamical Theory of the Electromagnetic Field", subtitled "Electromagnetic theory of light", Maxwell uses the correction to Ampère's Circuital Law made in part III of his 1862 paper, "On Physical Lines of Force", which is defined as displacement current, to derive the electromagnetic wave equation.

He obtained a wave equation with a speed in close agreement to experimental determinations of the speed of light. He commented,

The agreement of the results seems to show that light and magnetism are affections of the same substance, and that light is an electromagnetic disturbance propagated through the field according to electromagnetic laws.

Maxwell's derivation of the electromagnetic wave equation has been replaced in modern physics by a much less cumbersome method which combines the corrected version of Ampère's Circuital Law with Faraday's law of electromagnetic induction.

=== Modern equation methods ===
To obtain the electromagnetic wave equation in a vacuum using the modern method, we begin with the modern 'Heaviside' form of Maxwell's equations. Using (SI units) in a vacuum, these equations are

$\nabla \cdot \mathbf{E} = 0$
$\nabla \times \mathbf{E} = -\mu_o \frac{\partial \mathbf{H}} {\partial t}$
$\nabla \cdot \mathbf{H} = 0$
$\nabla \times \mathbf{H} =\varepsilon_o \frac{ \partial \mathbf{E}} {\partial t}$

If we take the curl of the curl equations we obtain

$\nabla \times \nabla \times \mathbf{E} = -\mu_o \frac{\partial } {\partial t} \nabla \times \mathbf{H} = -\mu_o \varepsilon_o \frac{\partial^2 \mathbf{E} } {\partial t^2}$

$\nabla \times \nabla \times \mathbf{H} = \varepsilon_o \frac{\partial } {\partial t} \nabla \times \mathbf{E} = -\mu_o \varepsilon_o \frac{\partial^2 \mathbf{H} } {\partial t^2}$

If we note the vector identity

$\nabla \times \left( \nabla \times \mathbf{V} \right) = \nabla \left( \nabla \cdot \mathbf{V} \right) - \nabla^2 \mathbf{V}$

where $\mathbf{V}$ is any vector function of space, we recover the wave equations

${\partial^2 \mathbf{E} \over \partial t^2} \ - \ c^2 \cdot \nabla^2 \mathbf{E} \ \ = \ \ 0$

${\partial^2 \mathbf{H} \over \partial t^2} \ - \ c^2 \cdot \nabla^2 \mathbf{H} \ \ = \ \ 0$

where

$c = { 1 \over \sqrt{ \mu_o \varepsilon_o } } = 2.99792458 \times 10^8$ meters per second

is the speed of light in free space.

== Legacy and impact ==
Of this paper and Maxwell's related works, fellow physicist Richard Feynman said: "From the long view of this history of mankind – seen from, say, 10,000 years from now – there can be little doubt that the most significant event of the 19th century will be judged as Maxwell's discovery of the laws of electromagnetism."

Albert Einstein used Maxwell's equations as the starting point for his special theory of relativity, presented in The Electrodynamics of Moving Bodies, one of Einstein's 1905 Annus Mirabilis papers. In it is stated:

the same laws of electrodynamics and optics will be valid for all frames of reference for which the equations of mechanics hold good

and

Any ray of light moves in the "stationary" system of co-ordinates with the determined velocity c, whether the ray be emitted by a stationary or by a moving body.

Maxwell's equations can also be derived by extending general relativity into five physical dimensions.

== See also ==
- A Treatise on Electricity and Magnetism
- Gauge theory
