= The History of Extinguished Eyes =

Novel by Nabīl Sulaymān

- First edition
- Author: Nabil Sulayman
- Language: Arabic
- Genre: Novel
- Publication date: 2019
- Pages: 346

The History of Extinguished Eyes (Arabic: تاريخ العيون المطفأة) is a novel by the Syrian novelist and critic Nabīl Sulaymān. This novel was published by Dar –mslkylyāny for Publishing and Dar meem.

== Content ==
This novel came in a new narrative form, with a chronological and spatial cover written in fiction and events taken from a real life details that belonged to a genuine reality, in which the fictional world rises to war, love, art, law, savagery, and devastation.

The novel chooses to furnish its humanity the subject of blindness in all of its prejudicial symbolism and in a new approach, so that the narrative background against which the world's limits are established will be battled by forces that are visible and not visible.

The characters in "The History of Extinguished Eyes" share their suffering from authoritarianism's sword, which results in the restriction of freedoms, security pursuits, displacement, and assassinations, overshadowing the fast-moving and short-term relationships in countries where freedom is restricted and whose citizens are dominated by a grueling sense of oppression and defeat.
