= Rosser's equation (physics) =

In physics, Rosser's equation aids in understanding the role of displacement current in Maxwell's equations, given that there is no aether in empty space as initially assumed by Maxwell. Due originally to William G.V. Rosser, the equation was labeled by Selvan:

It can thus be seen that Rosser's Equation (19) in terms of transverse current density has actually hidden away the displacement current.

== Equation ==
Rosser's Equation is given by the following:

$-\mu_0 \mathbf{J} + \mu_0 \varepsilon_0 \nabla \frac{\partial \phi}{\partial t} = -\mu_0 \left( \mathbf{J} - \varepsilon_0 \nabla \frac{\partial \phi}{\partial t} \right) = -\mu_0 \mathbf{J_t}$

where:

$J\,$ is the conduction-current density,
$J_t\,$ is the transverse current density,
$t\,$ is time, and
$\phi\,$ is the scalar potential.

To understand Selvan's quotation we need the following terms: $\rho$ is charge density, $\mathbf{A}$ is the magnetic vector potential, and $\mathbf{D}$ is the displacement field. Given these, the following standard Maxwell relations hold:

$\nabla \cdot \left( -\nabla \phi - \frac{\partial \mathbf{A}}{\partial t} \right) = \frac{\rho}{\varepsilon_0}$

$\mu_0 \left(\mathbf{J} + \frac{\partial \mathbf{D}}{\partial t} \right) = -\nabla^{2} \mathbf{A}$

The term $\frac{\partial \mathbf{D}}{\partial t}$ is the displacement current that Selvan notes is "hidden away" in Rosser's Equation. Selvan (ibid.) quotes Rosser himself as follows:

A lot of confusion about the role of the displacement current in empty space might be avoided, if it were called something else that did not include the term current. If a name is needed, it could be called the Maxwell term in honour of the man who first introduced it.
