= On Physical Lines of Force =

1861 physics paper by James Clerk Maxwell

"On Physical Lines of Force" is a four-part paper written by James Clerk Maxwell, published in 1861. In it, Maxwell derived the equations of electromagnetism in conjunction with a "sea" of "molecular vortices" which he used to model Faraday's lines of force. Maxwell had studied and commented on the field of electricity and magnetism as early as 1855/56 when "On Faraday's Lines of Force" was read to the Cambridge Philosophical Society. Maxwell made an analogy between the density of this medium and the magnetic permeability, as well as an analogy between the transverse elasticity and the dielectric constant, and using the results of a prior experiment by Wilhelm Eduard Weber and Rudolf Kohlrausch performed in 1856, he established a connection between the speed of light and the speed of propagation of waves in this medium.

The paper ushered in a new era of classical electrodynamics and catalyzed further progress in the mathematical field of vector calculus. Because of this, it is considered one of the most historically significant publications in physics and science in general, comparable with Einstein's Annus Mirabilis papers and Newton's Principia Mathematica.

== Motivations ==
In 1856, Wilhelm Eduard Weber and Rudolf Kohlrausch performed an experiment with a Leyden jar and established the ratio of electric charge as measured statically to the same electric charge as measured electrodynamically. Maxwell used this ratio in Isaac Newton's equation for the speed of sound, as applied using the density and transverse elasticity of his sea of molecular vortices. He obtained a value which was very close to the speed of light, as recently measured directly by Hippolyte Fizeau. Maxwell then wrote

"we can scarcely avoid the inference that light consists in the transverse undulations of the same medium which is the cause of electric and magnetic phenomena"

It was also in this 1861 paper that Maxwell first introduced the displacement current term which is now included in Ampère's circuital law. But it wasn't until his next paper in 1865, "A Dynamical Theory of the Electromagnetic Field" that Maxwell used this displacement current term to derive the electromagnetic wave equation.

$$\mathbf{\nabla}\times \mathbf{B} = \mu_0\mathbf{J} + \underbrace{\mu_0 \epsilon_0 \frac{\partial }{\partial t}\mathbf{E}}_\mathrm{Maxwell's \ term}$$

== Impact ==
The four modern Maxwell's equations, as laid down in a publication by Oliver Heaviside in 1884, had all appeared in Maxwell's 1861 paper. Heaviside however presented these equations in modern vector format using the nabla operator (∇) devised by William Rowan Hamilton in 1837,

Of Maxwell's work, Albert Einstein wrote:

"Imagine [Maxwell's] feelings when the differential equations he had formulated proved to him that electromagnetic fields spread in the form of polarised waves, and at the speed of light! To few men in the world has such an experience been vouchsafed... it took physicists some decades to grasp the full significance of Maxwell's discovery, so bold was the leap that his genius forced upon the conceptions of his fellow-workers."

Other physicists were equally impressed with Maxwell's work, such as Richard Feynman who commented:

"From a long view of the history of the world—seen from, say, ten thousand years from now—there can be little doubt that the most significant event of the 19th century will be judged as Maxwell's discovery of the laws of electromagnetism. The American Civil War will pale into provincial insignificance in comparison with this important scientific event of the same decade."

Charles Coulston Gillispie states that the paper introduced the word "field" to the world of physics, but Faraday first coined the term in 1849.

== See also ==
- A Treatise on Electricity and Magnetism
- Flux tube
