= Displacement current density =

Physical quantity in electromagnetism

In electromagnetism, displacement current density is the rate of change of the electric displacement field D, appearing as ∂D/∂t in Maxwell's equations. Displacement current density has the same units as electric current density, and it is a source of the magnetic field just as actual current is. However it is not an electric current of moving charges, but a time-varying electric field. In physical materials (as opposed to vacuum), there is also a contribution from the slight motion of charges bound in atoms, called dielectric polarization.

The idea was conceived by James Clerk Maxwell in his 1861 paper "On Physical Lines of Force" (Part III) in connection with the displacement of electric particles in a dielectric medium. Maxwell added displacement current to the electric current term in Ampère's circuital law. In his 1865 paper A Dynamical Theory of the Electromagnetic Field Maxwell used this amended version of Ampère's circuital law to derive the electromagnetic wave equation. This derivation is now generally accepted as a historical landmark in physics by virtue of uniting electricity, magnetism and optics into one single unified theory. The displacement current term is now seen as a crucial addition that completed Maxwell's equations and is necessary to explain many phenomena, most particularly the existence of electromagnetic waves.

== Explanation ==
The electric displacement field D is defined as:

$$\mathbf{D} = \varepsilon_0  \mathbf{E} +  \mathbf{P}\ ,$$

where:

- ε_{0} is the permittivity of free space;
- E is the electric field intensity; and
- P is the polarization of the medium.

Differentiating this equation with respect to time defines the displacement current density (J_{D}), which therefore has two components in a dielectric (see also "current density#Displacement current"):

$$\mathbf{J}_\mathrm{D} = \varepsilon_0 \frac{\partial \mathbf{E}}{\partial t} + \frac{\partial  \mathbf{P}}{\partial t}\,.$$

The first term on the right hand side is present in material media and in free space. It doesn't necessarily come from any actual movement of charge, but it does have an associated magnetic field, just as a current does due to charge motion. Some authors apply the name displacement current to the first term by itself.

The second term on the right hand side, called polarization current density, comes from the change in polarization of the individual molecules of the dielectric material. Polarization results when, under the influence of an applied electric field, the charges in molecules have moved from a position of exact cancellation. The positive and negative charges in molecules separate, causing an increase in the state of polarization P. A changing state of polarization corresponds to charge movement and so is equivalent to a current, hence the term "polarization current". Thus,

$$I_\mathrm{D} =\iint_S\mathbf{J}_\mathrm{D}\cdot\operatorname{d}\!\mathbf{S} = \iint_S\frac{\partial \mathbf{D}}{\partial t} \cdot \operatorname{d}\!\mathbf{S}=\frac{\partial}{\partial t}\iint_S \mathbf{D} \cdot \operatorname{d}\!\mathbf{S}=\frac{\partial \Phi_\mathrm{D}}{\partial t}\,.$$

This polarization is the displacement current as it was originally conceived by Maxwell. Maxwell made no special treatment of the vacuum, treating it as a material medium. For Maxwell, the effect of P was simply to change the relative permittivity ε_{r} in the relation D = ε_{0}ε_{r} E.

The modern justification of displacement current is explained below.

=== Isotropic dielectric case ===
In the case of a very simple dielectric material the constitutive relation holds:

$$\mathbf{D} = \varepsilon \, \mathbf{E} ~ ,$$

where the permittivity $\varepsilon = \varepsilon_0 \, \varepsilon_\mathrm{r}$ is the product of:

- ε_{0}, the permittivity of free space, or the electric constant; and
- ε_{r}, the relative permittivity of the dielectric.

In the equation above, the use of ε accounts for the polarization (if any) of the dielectric material.

The scalar value of displacement current may also be expressed in terms of electric flux:

$$I_\mathrm{D} = \varepsilon \, \frac{\, \partial \Phi_\mathrm{E}  \, }{\partial t} ~ .$$

The forms in terms of scalar ε are correct only for linear isotropic materials. For linear non-isotropic materials, ε becomes a matrix; even more generally, ε may be replaced by a tensor, which may depend upon the electric field itself, or may exhibit frequency dependence (hence dispersion).

For a linear isotropic dielectric, the polarization P is given by:

$$\mathbf{P} = \varepsilon_0 \chi_\mathrm{e}  \, \mathbf{E} = \varepsilon_0 (\varepsilon_\mathrm{r} - 1) \, \mathbf{E} ~,$$

where χ_{e} is known as the susceptibility of the dielectric to electric fields. Note that

$$\varepsilon = \varepsilon_\mathrm{r} \, \varepsilon_0 = \left( 1 + \chi_\mathrm{e} \right) \, \varepsilon_0 ~.$$

== Necessity ==
Some implications of the displacement current follow, which agree with experimental observation, and with the requirements of logical consistency for the theory of electromagnetism.

=== Generalizing Ampère's circuital law ===
==== Current in capacitors ====
An example illustrating the need for the displacement current arises in connection with capacitors with no medium between the plates. Consider the charging capacitor in the figure.

An electrically charging capacitor with an imaginary cylindrical surface surrounding the left-hand plate. Right-hand surface R lies in the space between the plates and left-hand surface L lies to the left of the left plate. No conduction current enters cylinder surface R, while current I leaves through surface L. Consistency of Ampère's law requires a displacement current I_{D} = I to flow across surface R.

The capacitor is in a circuit that causes equal and opposite charges to appear on the left plate and the right plate, charging the capacitor and increasing the electric field between its plates. No actual charge is transported through the vacuum between its plates. Nonetheless, a magnetic field exists between the plates as though a current were present there as well. One explanation is that a displacement current I_{D} "flows" in the vacuum, and this current produces the magnetic field in the region between the plates according to Ampère's law:

$$\oint_C \mathbf{B} \cdot \operatorname{d}\!\boldsymbol{\ell} = \mu_0 I_\mathrm{D} ~ ,$$

where

- $\oint_C$ is the closed line integral around some closed curve C;
- $\mathbf{B}$ is the magnetic field measured in teslas;
- $\operatorname{\cdot} ~$ is the vector dot product;
- $\mathrm{d} \boldsymbol{\ell}$ is an infinitesimal vector line element along the curve C, that is, a vector with magnitude equal to the length element of C, and direction given by the tangent to the curve C;
- $\mu_0 \,$ is the magnetic constant, also called the permeability of free space; and
- $I_\mathrm{D} \,$ is the net displacement current that passes through a small surface bounded by the curve C.

The magnetic field between the plates is the same as that outside the plates, so the displacement current must be the same as the conduction current in the wires, that is,

$$I_\mathrm{D} = I \, ,$$

which extends the notion of current beyond a mere transport of charge.

Next, this displacement current is related to the charging of the capacitor. Consider the current in the imaginary cylindrical surface shown surrounding the left plate. A current, say I, passes outward through the left surface L of the cylinder, but no conduction current (no transport of real charges) crosses the right surface R. Notice that the electric field E between the plates increases as the capacitor charges. That is, in a manner described by Gauss's law, assuming no dielectric between the plates:

$$Q(t) = \varepsilon_0  \oint_S \mathbf{E}(t) \cdot \operatorname{d}\!\mathbf{S}\, ,$$

where S refers to the imaginary cylindrical surface. Assuming a parallel plate capacitor with uniform electric field, and neglecting fringing effects around the edges of the plates, according to charge conservation equation

$$I = -\frac{\mathrm{d} Q}{\mathrm{d} t} = - \varepsilon_0  \oint_S\frac{\partial \mathbf{E}}{\partial t} \cdot \operatorname{d}\!\mathbf{S} = S \, \varepsilon_0 \Biggl. \frac{\partial \mathbf{E}}{\partial t} \Biggr|_R  ~ ,$$

where the first term has a negative sign because charge leaves surface L (the charge is decreasing), the last term has a positive sign because unit vector of surface R is from left to right while the direction of electric field is from right to left, S is the area of the surface R. The electric field at surface L is zero because surface L is in the outside of the capacitor. Under the assumption of a uniform electric field distribution inside the capacitor, the displacement current density J_{D} is found by dividing by the area of the surface:

$$\mathbf{J}_\mathrm{D} = \frac{\mathbf{I}_\mathrm{D}}{S} = \frac{\mathbf I}{S} =  \varepsilon_0 \frac{\partial \mathbf E}{\partial t} = \frac{\partial  \mathbf D}{\partial t} ~ ,$$

where I is the current leaving the cylindrical surface (which must equal I_{D}) and J_{D} is the flow of charge per unit area into the cylindrical surface through the face R.

Combining these results, the magnetic field is found using the integral form of Ampère's law with an arbitrary choice of contour provided the displacement current density term is added to the conduction current density (the Ampère-Maxwell equation):

$$\oint_{\partial S} \mathbf{B} \cdot \operatorname{d}\!\boldsymbol{\ell} = \mu_0 \int_S \left(\mathbf{J} + \epsilon_0 \frac {\partial \mathbf{E}}{\partial t}\right) \cdot \operatorname{d}\! \mathbf{S}\,.$$

This equation says that the integral of the magnetic field B around the edge $\partial S$ of a surface S is equal to the integrated current J through any surface with the same edge, plus the displacement current term $\varepsilon_0 \partial \mathbf{E} / \partial t$ through whichever surface.

Example showing two surfaces S_{1} and S_{2} that share the same bounding contour ∂S. However, S_{1} is pierced by conduction current, while S_{2} is pierced by displacement current. Surface S_{2} is closed under the capacitor plate.

As depicted in the figure to the right, the current crossing surface S_{1} is entirely conduction current. Applying the Ampère-Maxwell equation to surface S_{1} yields:

$$B = \frac {\mu_0 I}{2 \pi r} ~ .$$

However, the current crossing surface S_{2} is entirely displacement current. Applying this law to surface S_{2}, which is bounded by exactly the same curve $\partial S$, but lies between the plates, produces:

$$B = \frac {\mu_0 I_\mathrm{D}}{2 \pi r} ~ .$$

Any surface S_{1} that intersects the wire has current I passing through it so Ampère's law gives the correct magnetic field. However a second surface S_{2} bounded by the same edge $\partial S$ could be drawn passing between the capacitor plates, therefore having no current passing through it. Without the displacement current term Ampere's law would give zero magnetic field for this surface. Therefore, without the displacement current term Ampere's law gives inconsistent results, the magnetic field would depend on the surface chosen for integration. Thus the displacement current term $\varepsilon_0 \partial \mathbf{E} / \partial t$ is necessary as a second source term which gives the correct magnetic field when the surface of integration passes between the capacitor plates. Because the current is increasing the charge on the capacitor's plates, the electric field between the plates is increasing, and the rate of change of electric field gives the correct value for the field B found above.

==== Mathematical formulation ====
In a more mathematical vein, the same results can be obtained from the underlying differential equations. Consider for simplicity a non-magnetic medium where the relative magnetic permeability is unity, and the complication of magnetization current (bound current) is absent, so that $\mathbf{M} = 0$ and $\mathbf{J} = \mathbf{J}_\mathrm{f}$. The current leaving a volume must equal the rate of decrease of charge in a volume. In differential form this continuity equation becomes:

$$\nabla \cdot \mathbf{J}_\mathrm{f} = -\frac {\partial \rho_\mathrm{f}}{\partial t}\,,$$

where the left side is the divergence of the free current density and the right side is the rate of decrease of the free charge density. However, Ampère's law in its original form states:

$$\nabla \times \mathbf{B} = \mu_0 \mathbf{J}_\mathrm{f}\,,$$

which implies that the divergence of the current term vanishes, contradicting the continuity equation. (Vanishing of the divergence is a result of the mathematical identity that states the divergence of a curl is always zero.) This conflict is removed by addition of the displacement current, as then:

$$\nabla \times \mathbf{B} = \mu_0 \left(\mathbf{J} + \varepsilon_0 \frac{ \partial \mathbf{E} }{ \partial t }\right) = \mu_0 \left( \mathbf{J}_\mathrm{f}  + \frac{\partial \mathbf{D}}{\partial t }\right)\,,$$

and

$$\nabla \cdot \left( \nabla  \times \mathbf{B} \right) = 0 = \mu_0 \left( \nabla \cdot \mathbf{J}_\mathrm{f} +\frac {\partial }{\partial t} \nabla \cdot \mathbf{D} \right)\,,$$

which is in agreement with the continuity equation because of Gauss's law:

$$\nabla \cdot \mathbf{D} = \rho_\mathrm{f}\,.$$

=== Wave propagation ===
The added displacement current also leads to wave propagation by taking the curl of the equation for magnetic field.

$$\mathbf{J}_\mathrm{D} = \epsilon_0\frac{\partial \mathbf{E}}{\partial t}\,.$$

Substituting this form for J into Ampère's law, and assuming there is no bound or free current density contributing to J:

$$\nabla \times \mathbf{B} = \mu_0 \mathbf{J}_\mathrm{D}\,,$$

with the result:

$$\nabla \times \left(\nabla \times \mathbf{B} \right) = \mu_0 \epsilon_0 \frac{\partial}{\partial t} \nabla \times \mathbf{E}\,.$$

However,
$$\nabla \times \mathbf{E} = -\frac{\partial}{\partial t} \mathbf{B}\,,$$

leading to the wave equation:
$$-\nabla \times \left( \nabla \times \mathbf{B} \right) = \nabla^2 \mathbf{B} =\mu_0 \epsilon_0 \frac {\partial^2}{\partial t^2} \mathbf{B} = \frac{1}{c^2} \frac{\partial^2}{\partial t^2} \mathbf{B}\,,$$

where use is made of the vector identity that holds for any vector field V(r, t):

$$\nabla \times \left(\nabla \times \mathbf{V}\right) = \nabla \left(\nabla \cdot \mathbf{V}\right) - \nabla^2 \mathbf{V}\,,$$

and the fact that the divergence of the magnetic field is zero. An identical wave equation can be found for the electric field by taking the curl:

$$\nabla \times \left(\nabla \times \mathbf{E} \right) = -\frac {\partial}{\partial t}\nabla \times \mathbf{B} = -\mu_0 \frac {\partial}{\partial t} \left(\mathbf{J} + \epsilon_0\frac {\partial}{\partial t} \mathbf{E} \right)\,.$$

If J, P, and ρ are zero, the result is:

$$\nabla^2 \mathbf{E} = \mu_0 \epsilon_0 \frac{\partial^2}{\partial t^2} \mathbf{E} = \frac{1}{c^2} \frac{\partial^2}{\partial t^2} \mathbf{E}\,.$$

The electric field can be expressed in the general form:

$$\mathbf{E} = - \nabla \varphi - \frac{\partial \mathbf{A}}{\partial t}\,,$$

where φ is the electric potential (which can be chosen to satisfy Poisson's equation) and A is a vector potential (i.e. magnetic vector potential, not to be confused with surface area, as A is denoted elsewhere). The ∇φ component on the right hand side is the Gauss's law component, and this is the component that is relevant to the conservation of charge argument above. The second term on the right-hand side is the one relevant to the electromagnetic wave equation, because it is the term that contributes to the curl of E. Because of the vector identity that says the curl of a gradient is zero, ∇φ does not contribute to ∇×E.

== History and interpretation ==
Maxwell's displacement current was postulated in part III of his 1861 paper 'On Physical Lines of Force'. Few topics in modern physics have caused as much confusion and misunderstanding as that of displacement current. This is in part due to the fact that Maxwell used a sea of molecular vortices in his derivation, while modern textbooks operate on the basis that displacement current can exist in free space. Maxwell's derivation is unrelated to the modern day derivation for displacement current in the vacuum, which is based on consistency between Ampère's circuital law for the magnetic field and the continuity equation for electric charge.

Maxwell's purpose is stated by him at (Part I, p. 161):

I propose now to examine magnetic phenomena from a mechanical point of view, and to determine what tensions in, or motions of, a medium are capable of producing the mechanical phenomena observed.

He is careful to point out the treatment is one of analogy:

The author of this method of representation does not attempt to explain the origin of the observed forces by the effects due to these strains in the elastic solid, but makes use of the mathematical analogies of the two problems to assist the imagination in the study of both.

In part III, in relation to displacement current, he says

I conceived the rotating matter to be the substance of certain cells, divided from each other by cell-walls composed of particles which are very small compared with the cells, and that it is by the motions of these particles, and their tangential action on the substance in the cells, that the rotation is communicated from one cell to another.

Clearly Maxwell was driving at magnetization even though the same introduction clearly talks about dielectric polarization.

Maxwell compared the speed of electricity measured by Wilhelm Eduard Weber and Rudolf Kohlrausch (193,088 miles/second) and the speed of light determined by the Fizeau experiment (195,647 miles/second). Based on their same speed, he concluded that "light consists of transverse undulations in the same medium that is the cause of electric and magnetic phenomena."

But although the above quotations point towards a magnetic explanation for displacement current, for example, based upon the divergence of the above curl equation, Maxwell's explanation ultimately stressed linear polarization of dielectrics:

This displacement ... is the commencement of a current ... The amount of displacement depends on the nature of the body, and on the electromotive force so that if h is the displacement, R the electromotive force, and E a coefficient depending on the nature of the dielectric:

$$R = -4\pi \mathrm E^2 h \,;$$
and if r is the value of the electric current due to displacement
$$r = \frac{dh}{dt}\,,$$
These relations are independent of any theory about the mechanism of dielectrics; but when we find electromotive force producing electric displacement in a dielectric, and when we find the dielectric recovering from its state of electric displacement ... we cannot help regarding the phenomena as those of an elastic body, yielding to a pressure and recovering its form when the pressure is removed.

— On Physical Lines of Force, Part III, The theory of molecular vortices applied to statical electricity, pp. 14–15

With some change of symbols (and units) combined with the results deduced in the section § Current in capacitors (r → J, R → −E, and the material constant E^{−2} → 4πε_{r}ε_{0} these equations take the familiar form between a parallel plate capacitor with uniform electric field, and neglecting fringing effects around the edges of the plates:

$$J = \frac{d}{dt} \frac {1}{4 \pi \mathrm E^2} E = \frac{d}{dt} \varepsilon_r\varepsilon_0 E = \frac{d}{dt} D\,.$$

When it came to deriving the electromagnetic wave equation from displacement current in his 1865 paper 'A Dynamical Theory of the Electromagnetic Field', he got around the problem of the non-zero divergence associated with Gauss's law and dielectric displacement by eliminating the Gauss term and deriving the wave equation exclusively for the solenoidal magnetic field vector.

Maxwell's emphasis on polarization diverted attention towards the electric capacitor circuit, and led to the common belief that Maxwell conceived of displacement current so as to maintain conservation of charge in an electric capacitor circuit. There are a variety of debatable notions about Maxwell's thinking, ranging from his supposed desire to perfect the symmetry of the field equations to the desire to achieve compatibility with the continuity equation.

== See also ==
- Electromagnetic wave equation
- Ampère's circuital law
- Capacitance

== Maxwell's papers ==
- On Faraday's Lines of Force Maxwell's paper of 1855
- On Physical Lines of Force Maxwell's paper of 1861
- A Dynamical Theory of the Electromagnetic Field Maxwell's paper of 1864
