= A Treatise on Electricity and Magnetism =

1873 books by James Clerk Maxwell

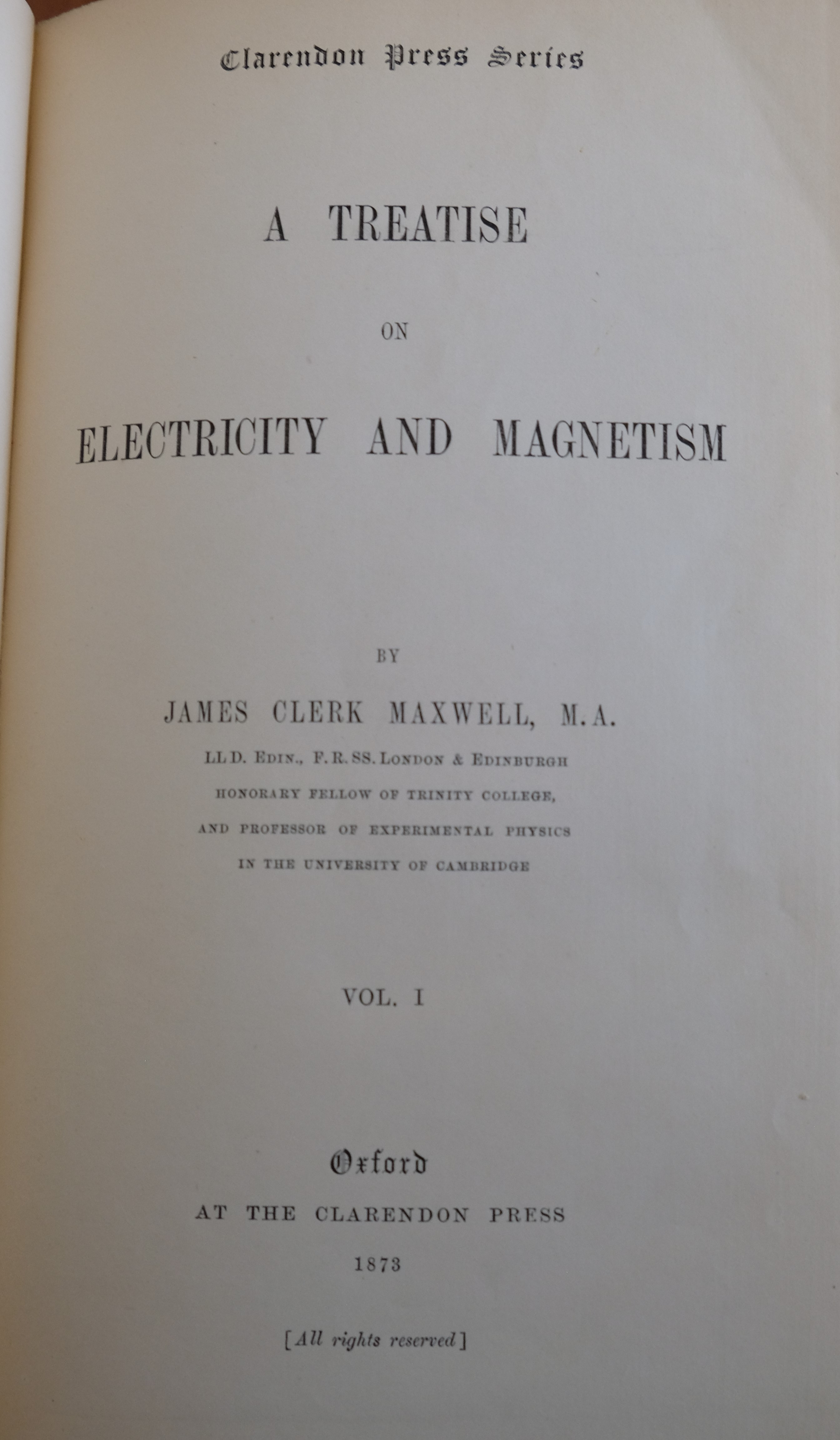
- Title page of volume I
- Author: James Clerk Maxwell
- Language: English
- Subject: Electromagnetism
- Genre: Non-fiction
- Publisher: Oxford University Press
- Publication date: 1873
- Publication place: Great Britain
- Text: A Treatise on Electricity and Magnetism at Wikisource

A Treatise on Electricity and Magnetism is a two-volume treatise on electromagnetism written by James Clerk Maxwell in 1873. The work is described as both "celebrated" and "rambling and difficult", while admired as a pioneering mathematical source to understand electromagnetic theory. The four famous Maxwell's Equations were derived from its content in the next decade. Maxwell was revising the Treatise for a second edition when he died in 1879. The revision was completed by William Davidson Niven for publication in 1881. A third edition was prepared by J. J. Thomson for publication in 1892.

The treatise is said to be notoriously hard to read, containing plenty of ideas but lacking both the clear focus and orderliness that may have allowed it catch on more easily. It was noted by one historian of science that Maxwell's attempt at a comprehensive treatise on all of electrical science tended to bury the important results of his work under "long accounts of miscellaneous phenomena discussed from several points of view". He goes on to say that, outside the treatment of the Faraday effect, Maxwell failed to expound on his earlier work, especially the generation of electromagnetic waves and the derivation of the laws governing reflection and refraction.

Maxwell introduced the use of vector fields, and his labels have been perpetuated:

A (vector potential), B (magnetic induction), C (electric current), D (displacement), E (electric field – Maxwell's electromotive intensity), F (mechanical force), H (magnetic field – Maxwell's magnetic force).

Maxwell's work is considered an exemplar of rhetoric of science:

Lagrange's equations appear in the Treatise as the culmination of a long series of rhetorical moves, including (among others) Green's theorem, Gauss's potential theory and Faraday's lines of force – all of which have prepared the reader for the Lagrangian vision of a natural world that is whole and connected: a veritable sea change from Newton's vision.

== Contents ==
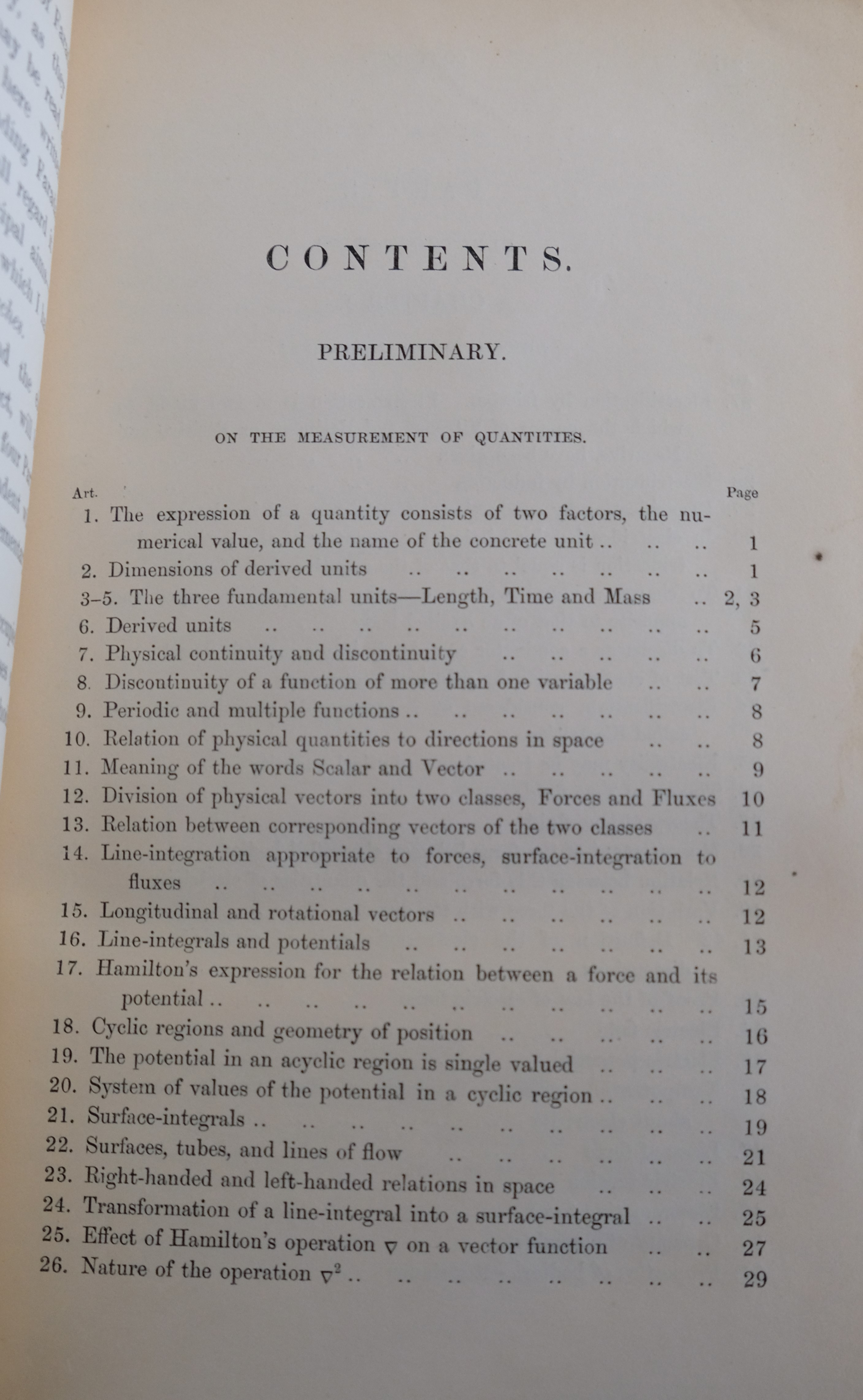
Preliminary On the Measurement of Quantities, A Treatise on Electricity and Magnetism (1873)

Preliminary. On the Measurement of Quantities.

Part I. Electrostatics.

1. Description of Phenomena.
2. Elementary Mathematical Theory of Electricity.
3. On Electrical Work and Energy in a System of Conductors.
4. General Theorems.
5. Mechanical Action Between Two Electrical Systems.
6. Points and Lines of Equilibrium.
7. Forms of Equipotential Surfaces and Lines of Flow.
8. Simple Cases of Electrification.
9. Spherical Harmonics.
10. Confocal Surfaces of the Second Degree.
11. Theory of Electric Images.
12. Conjugate Functions in Two Dimensions.
13. Electrostatic Instruments.

Part II. Electrokinematics.

1. The Electric Current.
2. Conduction and Resistance.
3. Electromotive Force Between Bodies in Contact.
4. Electrolysis.
5. Electrolytic Polarization.
6. Mathematical Theory of the Distribution of Electric Currents.
7. Conduction in Three Dimensions.
8. Resistance and Conductivity in Three Dimensions.
9. Conduction through Heterogeneous Media.
10. Conduction in Dielectrics.
11. Measurement of the Electric Resistance of Conductors.
12. Electric Resistance of Substances.

Part III. Magnetism

1. Elementary Theory of Magnetism.
2. Magnetic Force and Magnetic Induction.
3. Particular Forms of Magnets.
4. Induced Magnetization.
5. Magnetic Problems.
6. Weber's Theory of Magnetic Induction.
7. Magnetic Measurements.
8. Terrestrial Magnetism.

Part IV. Electromagnetism.

1. Electromagnetic Force.
2. Mutual Action of Electric Currents.
3. Induction of Electric Currents.
4. Induction of a Current on Itself.
5. General Equations of Dynamics.
6. Application of Dynamics to Electromagnetism.
7. Electrokinetics.
8. Exploration of the Field by means of the Secondary Circuit.
9. General Equations.
10. Dimensions of Electric Units.
11. Energy and Stress.
12. Current-Sheets.
13. Parallel Currents.
14. Circular Currents.
15. Electromagnetic Instruments.
16. Electromagnetic Observations.
17. Electrical Measurement of Coefficients of Induction.
18. Determination of Resistance in Electromagnetic Measure.
19. Comparison of Electrostatic With Electromagnetic Units.
20. Electromagnetic Theory of Light.
21. Magnetic Action on Light.
22. Electric Theory of Magnetism.
23. Theories of Action at a distance.

== Reception ==
=== Reviews ===
On April 24, 1873, Nature announced the publication with an extensive description and much praise. When the second edition was published in 1881, George Chrystal wrote the review for Nature.

Pierre Duhem published a critical essay outlining mistakes he found in Maxwell's Treatise. Duhem's book was reviewed in Nature.

=== Comments ===
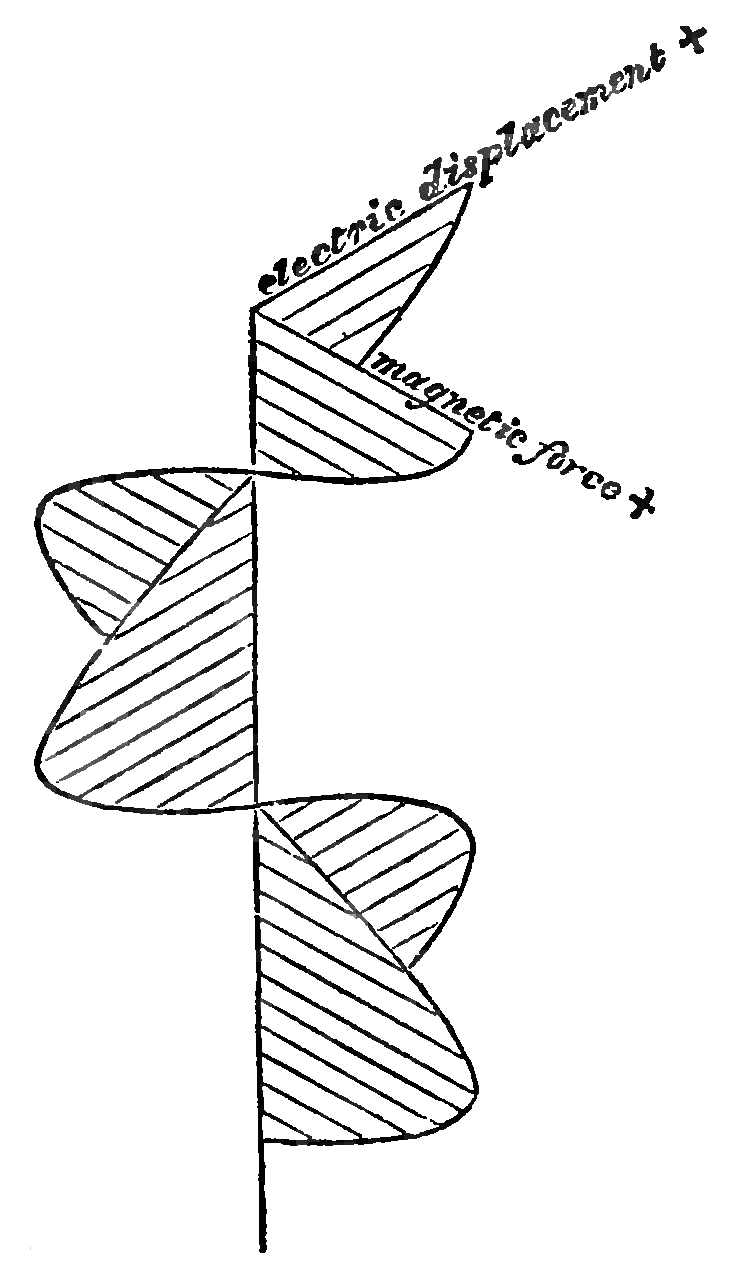
Fig. 66 in Volume 2 is an illustration of an electromagnetic wave

Hermann von Helmholtz (1881): "Now that the mathematical interpretations of Faraday's conceptions regarding the nature of electric and magnetic force has been given by Clerk Maxwell, we see how great a degree of exactness and precision was really hidden behind Faraday's words...it is astonishing in the highest to see what a large number of general theories, the mechanical deduction of which requires the highest powers of mathematical analysis, he has found by a kind of intuition, with the security of instinct, without the help of a single mathematical formula."

Oliver Heaviside (1893):”What is Maxwell's theory? The first approximation is to say: There is Maxwell's book as he wrote it; there is his text, and there are his equations: together they make his theory. But when we come to examine it closely, we find that this answer is unsatisfactory. To begin with, it is sufficient to refer to papers by physicists, written say during the first twelve years following the first publication of Maxwell's treatise to see that there may be much difference of opinion as to what his theory is. It may be, and has been, differently interpreted by different men, which is a sign that is not set forth in a perfectly clear and unmistakable form. There are many obscurities and some inconsistencies. Speaking for myself, it was only by changing its form of presentation that I was able to see it clearly, and so as to avoid the inconsistencies. Now there is no finality in a growing science. It is, therefore, impossible to adhere strictly to Maxwell's theory as he gave it to the world, if only on account of its inconvenient form.

Alexander Macfarlane (1902): "This work has served as the starting point of many advances made in recent years. Maxwell is the scientific ancestor of Hertz, Hertz of Marconi and all other workers at wireless telegraphy.

Oliver Lodge (1907) "Then comes Maxwell, with his keen penetration and great grasp of thought, combined with mathematical subtlety and power of expression; he assimilates the facts, sympathizes with the philosophic but untutored modes of expression invented by Faraday, links the theorems of Green and Stokes and Thomson to the facts of Faraday, and from the union rears the young modern science of electricity..."

E. T. Whittaker (1910): "In this celebrated work is comprehended almost every branch of electric and magnetic theory, but the intention of the writer was to discuss the whole from a single point of view, namely, that of Faraday, so that little or no account was given of the hypotheses that had been propounded in the two preceding decades by the great German electricians...The doctrines peculiar to Maxwell ... were not introduced in the first volume, or in the first half of the second."

Albert Einstein (1931): "Before Maxwell people conceived of physical reality – in so far as it is supposed to represent events in nature – as material points, whose changes consist exclusively of motions, which are subject to total differential equations. After Maxwell they conceived physical reality as represented by continuous fields, not mechanically explicable, which are subject to partial differential equations. This change in the conception of reality is the most profound and fruitful one that has come to physics since Newton; but it has at the same time to be admitted that the program has by no means been completely carried out yet."

Richard P. Feynman (1964): "From a long view of the history of mankind—seen from, say, ten thousand years from now—there can be little doubt that the most significant event of the 19th century will be judged as Maxwell's discovery of the laws of electrodynamics. The American Civil War will pale into provincial insignificance in comparison with this important scientific event of the same decade."

L. Pearce Williams (1991): "In 1873, James Clerk Maxwell published a rambling and difficult two-volume Treatise on Electricity and Magnetism that was destined to change the orthodox picture of physical reality. This treatise did for electromagnetism what Newton's Principia had done for classical mechanics. It not only provided the mathematical tools for the investigation and representation of the whole of electromagnetic theory, but it altered the very framework of both theoretical and experimental physics. Although the process had been going on throughout the nineteenth century, it was this work that finally displaced action at a distance physics and substituted the physics of the field."

Mark P. Silverman (1998) "I studied the principles on my own – in this case with Maxwell's Treatise as both my inspiration and textbook. This is not an experience that I would necessarily recommend to others. For all his legendary gentleness, Maxwell is a demanding teacher, and his magnum opus is anything but coffee-table reading...At the same time, the experience was greatly rewarding in that I had come to understand, as I realized much later, aspects of electromagnetism that are rarely taught at any level today and that reflect the unique physical insight of their creator.

Andrew Warwick (2003): "In developing the mathematical theory of electricity and magnetism in the Treatise, Maxwell made a number of errors, and for students with only a tenuous grasp of the physical concepts of basic electromagnetic theory and the specific techniques to solve some problems, it was extremely difficult to discriminate between cases where Maxwell made an error and cases where they simply failed to follow the physical or mathematical reasoning."

== See also ==
- "On Physical Lines of Force"
- "A Dynamical Theory of the Electromagnetic Field"
- Introduction to Electrodynamics
- Classical Electrodynamics
