= Electric displacement field =

Vector field related to displacement current and flux density

In physics, the electric displacement field (denoted by D), also called electric flux density, is a vector field that appears in Maxwell's equations. It accounts for the electromagnetic effects of polarization and that of an electric field, combining the two in an auxiliary field. It plays a major role in the physics of phenomena such as the capacitance of a material, the response of dielectrics to an electric field, how shapes can change due to electric fields in piezoelectricity or flexoelectricity as well as the creation of voltages and charge transfer due to elastic strains. The rate of change of D, ∂D/∂t, is the displacement current density.

Illustration of polarization due to a negative charge

In any material, if there is an inversion center then the charge at, for instance, $+x$ and $-x$ are the same. This means that there is no dipole. If an electric field is applied to an insulator, then (for instance) the negative charges can move slightly towards the positive side of the field, and the positive charges in the other direction. This leads to an induced dipole which is described as a polarization. There can be slightly different movements of the negative electrons and positive nuclei in molecules, or different displacements of the atoms in an ionic compound. Materials which do not have an inversion center display piezoelectricity and always have a polarization; in others spatially varying strains can break the inversion symmetry and lead to polarization, the flexoelectric effect. Other stimuli such as magnetic fields can lead to polarization in some materials, this being called the magnetoelectric effect.

== Definition ==
The electric displacement field "D" is defined as
$$\mathbf{D} \equiv \varepsilon_{0} \mathbf{E} + \mathbf{P},$$
where $\varepsilon_{0}$ is the vacuum permittivity (also called permittivity of free space), E is the electric field, and P is the (macroscopic) density of the permanent and induced electric dipole moments in the material, called the polarization density.

The displacement field satisfies Gauss's law in a dielectric:
$$\nabla\cdot\mathbf{D} = \rho -\rho_\text{b} = \rho_\text{f}$$

In this equation, $\rho_\text{f}$ is the number of free charges per unit volume. These charges are the ones that have made the volume non-neutral, and they are sometimes referred to as the space charge. This equation says, in effect, that the flux lines of D must begin and end on the free charges. In contrast $\rho_\text{b}$, which is called the bound charge, is an effective density of the charges that are part of a dipole. In the example of an insulating dielectric between metal capacitor plates, the only free charges are on the metal plates and dielectric contains only dipoles. The net, unbalanced bound charge at the metal/dielectric interface balances the charge on the metal plate. If the dielectric is replaced by a doped semiconductor or an ionised gas, etc, then electrons move relative to the ions, and if the system is finite they both contribute to $\rho_\text{f}$ at the edges.

D is not determined exclusively by the free charge. As E has a curl of zero in electrostatic situations, it follows that
$$\nabla \times \mathbf{D} = \nabla \times \mathbf{P}$$

The effect of this equation can be seen in the case of an object with a "frozen in" polarization like a bar electret, the electric analogue to a bar magnet. There is no free charge in such a material, but the inherent polarization gives rise to an electric field, demonstrating that the D field is not determined entirely by the free charge. The electric field is determined by using the above relation along with other boundary conditions on the polarization density to yield the bound charges, which will, in turn, yield the electric field.

In a linear, homogeneous, isotropic dielectric with instantaneous response to changes in the electric field, P depends linearly on the electric field,
$$\mathbf{P} = \varepsilon_{0} \chi \mathbf{E},$$
where the constant of proportionality $\chi$ is called the electric susceptibility of the material. Thus
$$\mathbf{D} = \varepsilon_{0} (1+\chi) \mathbf{E} = \varepsilon_{0} \varepsilon_{r} \mathbf{E} = \varepsilon \mathbf{E}$$
where ε_{r} = 1 + χ is the relative permittivity of the material, and ε is the permittivity.

In linear, homogeneous, isotropic media, ε is a constant. However, in linear anisotropic media it is a tensor, and in nonhomogeneous media it is a function of position inside the medium. It may also depend upon the electric field (nonlinear materials) and have a time dependent response. Explicit time dependence can arise if the materials are physically moving or changing in time (e.g. reflections off a moving interface give rise to Doppler shifts). A different form of time dependence can arise in a time-invariant medium, as there can be a time delay between the imposition of the electric field and the resulting polarization of the material. In this case, P is a convolution of the impulse response susceptibility χ and the electric field E. Such a convolution takes on a simpler form in the frequency domain: by Fourier transforming the relationship and applying the convolution theorem, one obtains the following relation for a linear time-invariant medium:
$$\mathbf{D}(\omega) = \varepsilon (\omega) \mathbf{E}(\omega) ,$$
where $\omega$ is the frequency of the applied field. The constraint of causality leads to the Kramers–Kronig relations, which place limitations upon the form of the frequency dependence. The phenomenon of a frequency-dependent permittivity is an example of material dispersion. In fact, all physical materials have some material dispersion because they cannot respond instantaneously to applied fields, but for many problems (those concerned with a narrow enough bandwidth) the frequency-dependence of ε can be neglected.

At a boundary, $(\mathbf{D_1} - \mathbf{D_2})\cdot \hat{\mathbf{n}} = D_{1,\perp} - D_{2,\perp} = \sigma_\text{f}$, where σ_{f} is the free charge density and the unit normal $\mathbf{\hat{n}}$ points in the direction from medium 2 to medium 1.

== History ==
The earliest known use of the term is from the year 1864, in James Clerk Maxwell's paper A Dynamical Theory of the Electromagnetic Field. Maxwell introduced the term D, specific capacity of electric induction, in a form different from the modern and familiar notations.

It was Oliver Heaviside who reformulated the complicated Maxwell's equations to the modern form. It wasn't until 1884 that Heaviside, concurrently with Willard Gibbs and Heinrich Hertz, grouped the equations together into a distinct set. This group of four equations was known variously as the Hertz–Heaviside equations and the Maxwell–Hertz equations, and is sometimes still known as the Maxwell–Heaviside equations; hence, it was probably Heaviside who lent D the present significance it now has.

== Example: Displacement field in a capacitor ==
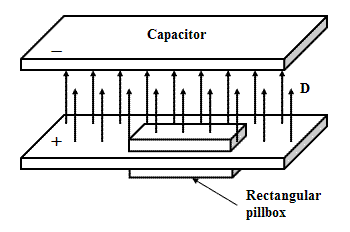
A parallel plate capacitor. Using an imaginary box, it is possible to use Gauss's law to explain the relationship between electric displacement and free charge.

Consider an infinite parallel plate capacitor where the space between the plates is empty or contains a neutral, insulating medium. In both cases, the free charges are only on the metal capacitor plates. Since the flux lines D end on free charges, and there are the same number of uniformly distributed charges of opposite sign on both plates, then the flux lines must all simply traverse the capacitor from one side to the other. In SI units, the charge density on the plates is proportional to the value of the D field between the plates. This follows directly from Gauss's law, by integrating over a small rectangular box straddling one plate of the capacitor:

$\scriptstyle _A$ $\mathbf{D} \cdot \mathrm{d}\mathbf{A}=Q_\text{free}$

On the sides of the box, dA is perpendicular to the field, so the integral over this section is zero, as is the integral on the face that is outside the capacitor where D is zero. The only surface that contributes to the integral is therefore the surface of the box inside the capacitor, and hence
$$|\mathbf{D}| A = |Q_\text{free}|,$$
where A is the surface area of the top face of the box and $Q_\text{free}/A=\rho_\text{f}$ is the free surface charge density on the positive plate. If the space between the capacitor plates is filled with a linear homogeneous isotropic dielectric with permittivity $\varepsilon =\varepsilon_0\varepsilon_r$, then there is a polarization induced in the medium, $\mathbf{D}=\varepsilon_0\mathbf{E}+\mathbf{P}=\varepsilon\mathbf{E}$ and so the voltage difference between the plates is
$$V =|\mathbf{E}| d =\frac{|\mathbf{D}|d}{\varepsilon}= \frac{|Q_\text{free}|d}{\varepsilon A}$$
where d is their separation.

Introducing the dielectric increases ε by a factor $\varepsilon_r$ and either the voltage difference between the plates will be smaller by this factor, or the charge must be higher. The partial cancellation of fields in the dielectric allows a larger amount of free charge to dwell on the two plates of the capacitor per unit of potential drop than would be possible if the plates were separated by vacuum.

If the distance d between the plates of a finite parallel plate capacitor is much smaller than its lateral dimensions we can approximate it using the infinite case and obtain its capacitance as
$$C = \frac{Q_\text{free}}{V} \approx \frac{Q_\text{free}}{|\mathbf{E}| d} = \frac{A}{d} \varepsilon,$$

== See also ==
- History of Maxwell's equations § The term Maxwell's equations
- Polarization density
- Electric susceptibility
- Magnetic field
- Electric dipole moment
