= Heaviside–Lorentz units =

System of electromagnetic units

Heaviside–Lorentz units (or Lorentz–Heaviside units) constitute a system of units and quantities that extends the CGS with a particular set of equations that defines electromagnetic quantities, named for Oliver Heaviside and Hendrik Antoon Lorentz. They share with the CGS-Gaussian system that the electric constant ε_{0} and magnetic constant µ_{0} do not appear in the defining equations for electromagnetism, having been incorporated implicitly into the electromagnetic quantities. Heaviside–Lorentz units may be thought of as normalizing ε_{0} = 1 and µ_{0} = 1, while at the same time revising Maxwell's equations to use the speed of light c instead.

The Heaviside–Lorentz unit system, like the International System of Quantities upon which the SI system is based, but unlike the CGS-Gaussian system, is rationalized, with the result that there are no factors of 4π appearing explicitly in Maxwell's equations. That this system is rationalized partly explains its appeal in quantum field theory: the Lagrangian underlying the theory does not have any factors of 4π when this system is used. Consequently, electromagnetic quantities in the Heaviside–Lorentz system differ by factors of √4π in the definitions of the electric and magnetic fields and of electric charge. Heaviside–Lorentz units are often used in relativistic calculations, (Note: As used by Einstein, such as in his book: Einstein, Albert (2005). The Meaning of Relativity (1956, 5th ed.). Princeton University Press (2005). pp. 21 ff.) and are used in particle physics. They are particularly convenient when performing calculations in spatial dimensions greater than three such as in string theory.

== Motivation ==
In the mid-late 19th century, electromagnetic measurements were frequently made in either the so-named electrostatic (ESU) or electromagnetic (EMU) systems of units. These were based respectively on Coulomb's and Ampere's Law. Use of these systems, as with to the subsequently developed Gaussian CGS units, resulted in many factors of 4π appearing in formulas for electromagnetic results, including those without any circular or spherical symmetry.

For example, in the CGS-Gaussian system, the capacitance of sphere of radius r is r while that of a parallel plate capacitor is A/4πd, where A is the area of the smaller plate and d is their separation.

Heaviside, who was an important, though somewhat personally isolated, early theorist of electromagnetism, suggested in 1882 that the irrational appearance of 4π in these sorts of relations could be removed by redefining the units for charges and fields. In his 1893 book Electromagnetic Theory, Heaviside wrote in the introduction:

It is not long since it was taken for granted that the common electrical units were correct. That curious and obtrusive constant 4π was considered by some to be a sort of blessed dispensation, without which all electrical theory would fall to pieces. I believe that this view is now nearly extinct, and that it is well recognised that the 4π was an unfortunate and mischievous mistake, the source of many evils.

In plain English, the common system of electrical units involves an irrationality of the same kind as would be brought into the metric system of weights and measures, were we to define the unit area to be the area, not of a square with unit side, but of a circle of unit diameter. The constant π would then obtrude itself into the area of a rectangle, and everywhere it should not be, and be a source of great confusion and inconvenience. So it is in the common electrical units, which are truly irrational.

Now, to make a mistake is easy and natural to man. But that is not enough. The next thing is to correct it: When a mistake has once been started, it is not necessary to go on repeating it for ever and ever with cumulative inconvenience.

Heaviside's normalization was popularized by Lorentz, who used it in his 1906 lectures, published in 1909 under the title The Theory of Electrons. Lorentz notes in the opening section, crediting Heaviside:

We shall not use these formulae in the rather complicated form in which they can be found in Maxwell's treatise, but in the clearer and more condensed form that has been given them by Heaviside and Hertz. In order to simplify matters as much as possible, I shall further introduce units of such a kind that we get rid of the larger part of such factors as 4π and √4π, by which the formulae were originally encumbered. As you well know, it was Heaviside who most strongly advocated the banishing of these superfluous factors and it will be well, I think, to follow his advice. Our unit of electricity will therefore be √4π times smaller than the usual electrostatic unit. This choice having been made, we have at the same time fixed for every case the number by which the electric force is to be represented. As to the magnetic force, we continue to understand by it the force acting on a north pole of unit strength; the latter however is likewise √4π times smaller than the unit commonly used.

== Length–mass–time framework ==
As in the Gaussian system (G), the Heaviside–Lorentz system (HL) uses the length–mass–time dimensions. This means that all of the units of electric and magnetic quantities are expressible in terms of the units of the base quantities length, time and mass.

Coulomb's equation, used to define charge in these systems, is F = q^{G}_{1}q^{G}_{2} / r^{2} in the Gaussian system, and F = q^{HL}_{1}q^{HL}_{2} / (4πr^{2}) in the HL system. The unit of charge then connects to 1 dyn⋅cm^{2} = 1 statC^{2} = 4π HLC^{2}, where 'HLC' is the HL unit of charge. The HL quantity q^{HL} describing a charge is then √4π times larger than the corresponding Gaussian quantity. There are comparable relationships for the other electromagnetic quantities (see below).

The commonly used set of units is the called the SI, which defines two constants, the vacuum permittivity (ε_{0}) and the vacuum permeability (μ_{0}). These can be used to convert SI units to their corresponding Heaviside–Lorentz values, as detailed below. For example, SI charge is √ε_{0}L^{3}M / T^{2}. When one puts ε_{0} = 8.854 pF/m, L = 1 cm, M = 1 g, and T = 1 s, this evaluates to 9.409669×10^{−11} C, the SI-equivalent of the Heaviside–Lorentz unit of charge.

== Comparison of Heaviside–Lorentz with other systems of units ==
This section has a list of the basic formulas of electromagnetism, given in the SI, Heaviside–Lorentz, and Gaussian systems. Here E and D are the electric field and the displacement field, respectively; B and H are the magnetic fields; P is the polarization density, M the magnetization, ρ the charge density, J the current density, c the speed of light in vacuum, ϕ the electric potential, A the magnetic vector potential, F the Lorentz force acting on a body of charge q and velocity v, ε the permittivity, χ_{e} the electric susceptibility, μ the magnetic permeability, and χ_{m} the magnetic susceptibility.

=== Maxwell's equations ===
Maxwell's equations in SI, Heaviside–Lorentz system, and Gaussian system
Name	SI	Heaviside–Lorentz system	Gaussian system
Gauss's law (macroscopic)	$\nabla \cdot \mathbf{D}^\textsf{SI} = \rho_\text{f}^\textsf{SI}$	$\nabla \cdot \mathbf{D}^\textsf{HL} = \rho_\text{f}^\textsf{HL}$	$\nabla \cdot \mathbf{D}^\textsf{G} = 4\pi\rho_\text{f}^\textsf{G}$
Gauss's law (microscopic)	$\nabla \cdot \mathbf{E}^\textsf{SI} = \rho^\textsf{SI}/\varepsilon_0$	$\nabla \cdot \mathbf{E}^\textsf{HL} = \rho^\textsf{HL}$	$\nabla \cdot \mathbf{E}^\textsf{G} = 4\pi\rho^\textsf{G}$
Gauss's law for magnetism	$\nabla \cdot \mathbf{B}^\textsf{SI} = 0$	$\nabla \cdot \mathbf{B}^\textsf{HL} = 0$	$\nabla \cdot \mathbf{B}^\textsf{G} = 0$
Maxwell–Faraday equation (Faraday's law of induction)	$\nabla \times \mathbf{E}^\textsf{SI} = -\frac{\partial \mathbf{B}^\textsf{SI}} {\partial t}$	$\nabla \times \mathbf{E}^\textsf{HL} = -\frac{1}{c}\frac{\partial \mathbf{B}^\textsf{HL}} {\partial t}$	$\nabla \times \mathbf{E}^\textsf{G} = -\frac{1}{c}\frac{\partial \mathbf{B}^\textsf{G}} {\partial t}$
Ampère–Maxwell equation (macroscopic)	$\nabla \times \mathbf{H}^\textsf{SI} = \mathbf{J}_{\text{f}}^\textsf{SI} + \frac{\partial \mathbf{D}^\textsf{SI}} {\partial t}$	$\nabla \times \mathbf{H}^\textsf{HL} = \frac{1}{c}\mathbf{J}_\text{f}^\textsf{HL} + \frac{1}{c}\frac{\partial \mathbf{D}^\textsf{HL}} {\partial t}$	$\nabla \times \mathbf{H}^\textsf{G} = \frac{4\pi}{c}\mathbf{J}_\text{f}^\textsf{G} + \frac{1}{c}\frac{\partial \mathbf{D}^\textsf{G}} {\partial t}$
Ampère–Maxwell equation (microscopic)	$\nabla \times \mathbf{B}^\textsf{SI} = \mu_0 \left( \mathbf{J}^\textsf{SI} + \varepsilon_0\frac{\partial \mathbf{E}^\textsf{SI}} {\partial t} \right)$	$\nabla \times \mathbf{B}^\textsf{HL} = \frac{1}{c}\mathbf{J}^\textsf{HL} + \frac{1}{c}\frac{\partial \mathbf{E}^\textsf{HL}} {\partial t}$	$\nabla \times \mathbf{B}^\textsf{G} = \frac{4\pi}{c}\mathbf{J}^\textsf{G} + \frac{1}{c}\frac{\partial \mathbf{E}^\textsf{G}} {\partial t}$

The electric and magnetic fields can be written in terms of the potentials A and ϕ. The definition of the magnetic field in terms of A, B = ∇ × A, is the same in all systems of units, but the electric field is $\mathbf{E} = -\nabla\phi-\frac{\partial \mathbf{A}}{\partial t}$ in the SI system, but $\mathbf{E} = -\nabla\phi-\frac{1}{c} \frac{\partial \mathbf{A}}{\partial t}$ in the HL or Gaussian systems.

=== Other basic laws ===
Other electrostatic laws in SI, Heaviside–Lorentz system, and Gaussian system
Name	SI	Heaviside–Lorentz system	Gaussian system
Lorentz force	$\mathbf{F} = q^\textsf{SI}\left(\mathbf{E}^\textsf{SI}+\mathbf{v}\times\mathbf{B}^\textsf{SI}\right)$	$\mathbf{F} = q^\textsf{HL}\left(\mathbf{E}^\textsf{HL}+\frac{1}{c}\mathbf{v}\times\mathbf{B}^\textsf{HL}\right)$	$\mathbf{F} = q^\textsf{G}\left(\mathbf{E}^\textsf{G}+\frac{1}{c}\mathbf{v}\times\mathbf{B}^\textsf{G}\right)$
Coulomb's law	$\mathbf{F} = \frac{1}{4\pi\varepsilon_0}\frac{q_1^\textsf{SI} q_2^\textsf{SI}}{r^2} \mathbf{\hat r}$	$\mathbf{F} = \frac{1}{4\pi}\frac{q_1^\textsf{HL} q_2^\textsf{HL}}{r^2} \mathbf{\hat r}$	$\mathbf{F} = \frac{q_1^\textsf{G} q_2^\textsf{G}}{r^2} \mathbf{\hat r}$
Electric field of stationary point charge	$\mathbf{E}^\textsf{SI} = \frac{1}{4\pi\varepsilon_0}\frac{q^\textsf{SI}}{r^2} \mathbf{\hat r}$	$\mathbf{E}^\textsf{HL} = \frac{1}{4\pi}\frac{q^\textsf{HL}}{r^2} \mathbf{\hat r}$	$\mathbf{E}^\textsf{G} = \frac{q^\textsf{G}}{r^2} \mathbf{\hat r}$
Biot–Savart law	$\mathbf{B}^\textsf{SI} = \frac{\mu_0}{4\pi} \oint\frac{I^\textsf{SI} d\mathbf{l} \times \mathbf{\hat r}}{r^2}$	$\mathbf{B}^\textsf{HL} = \frac{1}{4\pi c} \oint\frac{I^\textsf{HL} d\mathbf{l} \times \mathbf{\hat r}}{r^2}$	$\mathbf{B}^\textsf{G} = \frac{1}{c} \oint\frac{I^\textsf{G} d\mathbf{l} \times \mathbf{\hat r}}{r^2}$

=== Dielectric and magnetic materials ===
Below are the expressions for the macroscopic fields $\mathbf{D}$, $\mathbf{P}$, $\mathbf{H}$ and $\mathbf{M}$ in a material medium. It is assumed here for simplicity that the medium is homogeneous, linear, isotropic, and nondispersive, so that the susceptibilities are constants.

SI		Heaviside–Lorentz system		Gaussian system	
Dielectric	Magnetic	Dielectric	Magnetic	Dielectric	Magnetic
$$\begin{align}\mathbf{D}^\textsf{SI} &= \varepsilon_0 \mathbf{E}^\textsf{SI}+\mathbf{P}^\textsf{SI} \\ &= \varepsilon\mathbf{E}^\textsf{SI}\end{align}$$	$$\begin{align}\mathbf{B}^\textsf{SI} &= \mu_0 (\mathbf{H}^\textsf{SI}+\mathbf{M}^\textsf{SI}) \\ &= \mu^\textsf{SI}\mathbf{H}^\textsf{SI}\end{align}$$	$$\begin{align}\mathbf{D}^\textsf{HL} &= \mathbf{E}^\textsf{HL}+\mathbf{P}^\textsf{HL} \\ &= \varepsilon\mathbf{E}^\textsf{HL}\end{align}$$	$$\begin{align}\mathbf{B}^\textsf{HL} &= \mathbf{H}^\textsf{HL}+\mathbf{M}^\textsf{HL} \\ &= \mu^\textsf{HL}\mathbf{H}^\textsf{HL}\end{align}$$	$$\begin{align}\mathbf{D}^\textsf{G} &= \mathbf{E}^\textsf{G}+4\pi\mathbf{P}^\textsf{G} \\ &= \varepsilon\mathbf{E}^\textsf{G}\end{align}$$	$$\begin{align}\mathbf{B}^\textsf{G} &= \mathbf{H}^\textsf{G}+4\pi\mathbf{M}^\textsf{G} \\ &= \mu^\textsf{G}\mathbf{H}^\textsf{G}\end{align}$$
$\mathbf{P}^\textsf{SI} = \chi_\text{e}^\textsf{SI}\varepsilon_0\mathbf{E}^\textsf{SI}$	$\mathbf{M}^\textsf{SI} = \chi_\text{m}^\textsf{SI}\mathbf{H}^\textsf{SI}$	$\mathbf{P}^\textsf{HL} = \chi_\text{e}^\textsf{HL}\mathbf{E}^\textsf{HL}$	$\mathbf{M}^\textsf{HL} = \chi_\text{m}^\textsf{HL}\mathbf{H}^\textsf{HL}$	$\mathbf{P}^\textsf{G} = \chi_\text{e}^\textsf{G}\mathbf{E}^\textsf{G}$	$\mathbf{M}^\textsf{G} = \chi_\text{m}^\textsf{G}\mathbf{H}^\textsf{G}$
$\varepsilon^\textsf{SI}/\varepsilon_0 = 1+\chi_\text{e}^\textsf{SI}$	$\mu^\textsf{SI}/\mu_0 = 1+\chi_\text{m}^\textsf{SI}$	$\varepsilon^\textsf{HL} = 1+\chi_\text{e}^\textsf{HL}$	$\mu^\textsf{HL} = 1+\chi_\text{m}^\textsf{HL}$	$\varepsilon^\textsf{G} = 1+4\pi\chi_\text{e}^\textsf{G}$	$\mu^\textsf{G} = 1+4\pi\chi_\text{m}^\textsf{G}$

Note that the quantities $\varepsilon^\textsf{SI}/\varepsilon_0$, $\varepsilon^\textsf{HL}$ and $\varepsilon^\textsf{G}$ are dimensionless, and they have the same numeric value. By contrast, the electric susceptibility $\chi_\text{e}$ is dimensionless in all the systems, but has different numeric values for the same material:
$$\chi_\text{e}^\textsf{SI} = \chi_\text{e}^\textsf{HL} = 4\pi \chi_\text{e}^\textsf{G}$$
The same statements apply for the corresponding magnetic quantities.

== Advantages and disadvantages of Heaviside–Lorentz units ==
=== Advantages ===
- The formulas above are clearly simpler in HL units compared to either SI or Gaussian units. As Heaviside proposed, removing the 4π from the Gauss law and putting it in the Force law considerably reduces the number of places the π appears compared to Gaussian CGS units.
- Removing the explicit 4π from the Gauss law makes it clear that the inverse-square force law arises by the E field spreading out over the surface of a sphere. This allows a straightforward extension to other dimensions. For example, the case of long, parallel wires extending straight in the z direction can be considered a two-dimensional system. Another example is in string theory, where more than three spatial dimensions often need to be considered.

The below points are true in both Heaviside–Lorentz and Gaussian systems, but not SI.

- The equations are free of the constants ε_{0} and μ_{0} that are present in SI. (In addition ε_{0} and μ_{0} are overdetermined, because ε_{0} μ_{0} = 1 / c^{2}.)
- The electric and magnetic fields E and B have the same dimensions in the Heaviside–Lorentz system, meaning it is easy to recall where factors of c go in the Maxwell equations. Every time derivative comes with a 1 / c, which makes it dimensionally the same as a space derivative. In contrast, in SI units [E] / [B]=[c].
- Giving the E and B fields the same dimension makes their connection via relativity clearer. For example the electromagnetic tensor has no factors of c, and the Lorentz transformations of the fields are symmetrical. Similarly, ϕ and A have the same dimensions and are the four components of the 4-potential.
- The fields D, H, P, and M also have the same dimensions as E and B. For vacuum, any expression involving D can simply be recast as the same expression with E. In SI units, D and P have the same units, as do H and M, but they have different units from each other and from E and B.

=== Disadvantages ===
- Heaviside–Lorentz units, like the Gaussian CGS units by which they generally differ by a factor of about 3.5, are frequently of rather inconvenient sizes. The ampere (coulomb/second) is reasonable unit for measuring currents commonly encountered, but the ESU/s, as demonstrated above, is far too small. The Gaussian CGS unit of electric potential is named a statvolt. It is about 300 V, a value which is larger than most commonly encountered potentials. The henry, the SI unit for inductance is already on the large side compared to most inductors; the Gaussian unit is 12 orders of magnitude larger.
- A few of the Gaussian CGS units have names; none of the Heaviside–Lorentz units do.

Despite Heaviside's urgings, it proved difficult to persuade people to switch from the established units. He believed that if the units were changed, "[o]ld style instruments would very soon be in a minority, and then disappear ...". Persuading people to switch was already difficult in 1893, and in the meanwhile there have been more than a century's worth of additional textbooks printed and voltmeters built. Textbooks in theoretical physics use Heaviside–Lorentz units nearly exclusively, since their conceptual simplicity and compactness significantly clarify the discussions, and it is possible if necessary to convert the resulting answers to appropriate units after the fact by inserting appropriate factors of c and ε_{0}. Some textbooks on classical electricity and magnetism have been written using Gaussian CGS units, but recently some of them have been rewritten to use SI units. (Note: For example, the first and second editions of J. D. Jacksons's Classical Electrodynamics used Gaussian units exclusively, but in the third edition Jackson rewrote many of the chapters in SI units. Likewise, E. M. Purcell's Electricity and Magnetism, a commonly used textbook for introductory studies, was originally written in Gaussian units; the third edition was rewritten in SI units.) Outside of these contexts, including for example magazine articles on electric circuits, Heaviside–Lorentz and Gaussian CGS units are rarely encountered.

== Converting Heaviside–Lorentz units to Gaussian units ==
Gaussian equivalents of Heaviside–Lorentz units
Quantity	Symbol	Gaussian unit (in base units)	Gaussian equivalent of Heaviside–Lorentz unit
Electric charge	q	Fr (cm^{3/2}⋅g^{1/2}⋅s^{−1})	$\frac{1}{\sqrt{4\pi}} \, \mathrm{Fr}$
Electric current	I	statA (cm^{3/2}⋅g^{1/2}⋅s^{−2})	$\frac{1}{\sqrt{4\pi}} \, \mathrm{statA}$
Electric potential, Voltage	φ V	statV (cm^{1/2}⋅g^{1/2}⋅s^{−1})	$\sqrt{4\pi} \, \mathrm{statV}$
Electric field	E	statV/cm (cm^{−1/2}⋅g^{1/2}⋅s^{−1})	$\sqrt{4\pi} \, \mathrm{statV/cm}$
Electric displacement field	D	Fr/cm^{2} (cm^{−1/2}g^{1/2}s^{−1})	$\sqrt{4\pi} \, \mathrm{Fr/cm}^2$
Electric dipole moment	p	Fr⋅cm (cm^{5/2}⋅g^{1/2}⋅s^{−1})	$\frac{1}{\sqrt{4\pi}} \, \mathrm{Fr}{\cdot}\mathrm{cm}$
Electric flux (Note: The quantity here is the flux of the displacement field (D), not the electric field (E).)	Φ_{e}	Fr (cm^{3/2}⋅g^{1/2}⋅s^{−1})	$\sqrt{4\pi} \, \mathrm{Fr}$
Permittivity	ε	cm/cm	$1 \, \mathrm{cm/cm}$
Magnetic B field	B	G (cm^{−1/2}⋅g^{1/2}⋅s^{−1})	$\sqrt{4\pi} \, \mathrm{G}$
Magnetic H field	H	Oe (cm^{−1/2}⋅g^{1/2}⋅s^{−1})	$\sqrt{4\pi} \, \mathrm{Oe}$
Magnetic dipole moment	m	erg/G (cm^{5/2}⋅g^{1/2}⋅s^{−1})	$\frac{1}{\sqrt{4\pi}} \, \mathrm{erg/G}$
Magnetic flux	Φ_{m}	Mx (cm^{3/2}⋅g^{1/2}⋅s^{−1})	$\sqrt{4\pi} \, \mathrm{Mx}$
Permeability	μ	cm/cm	$1 \, \mathrm{cm/cm}$
Magnetomotive force	$\mathcal F$	Gi (cm^{1/2}⋅g^{1/2}⋅s^{−1})	$\sqrt{4\pi} \, \mathrm{Gi}$
Magnetic reluctance	$\mathcal R$	Gi/Mx (cm^{−1})	$1 \, \mathrm{Gi/Mx}$
Resistance	R	s/cm	$4\pi \, \mathrm{s/cm}$
Resistivity	ρ	s	$4\pi \, \mathrm{s}$
Capacitance	C	cm	$\frac{1}{4\pi} \, \mathrm{cm}$
Inductance	L	s^{2}/cm	$4\pi \, \mathrm{s}^2/\mathrm{cm}$

== Translating formulas between systems ==
To convert any formula between the SI, Heaviside–Lorentz system or Gaussian system, the corresponding expressions shown in the table below can be equated and hence substituted for each other. Replace $1/c^2$ by $\varepsilon_0 \mu_0$ or vice versa. This will reproduce any of the specific formulas given in the list above.

Equivalent expressions between SI, Heaviside–Lorentz system, and Gaussian system
Name	SI	Heaviside–Lorentz system	Gaussian system
electric field, electric potential	$\sqrt{\varepsilon_0} \left(\mathbf{E}^\textsf{SI}, \varphi^\textsf{SI}\right)$	$\left(\mathbf{E}^\textsf{HL}, \varphi^\textsf{HL}\right)$	$\frac{1}{\sqrt{4\pi}} \left(\mathbf{E}^\textsf{G}, \varphi^\textsf{G}\right)$
displacement field	$\frac{1}{\sqrt{\varepsilon_0}}\mathbf{D}^\textsf{SI}$	$\mathbf{D}^\textsf{HL}$	$\frac{1}{\sqrt{4\pi}}\mathbf{D}^\textsf{G}$
charge, charge density, current, current density, polarization density, electric dipole moment	$\frac{1}{\sqrt{\varepsilon_0}}\left(q^\textsf{SI}, \rho^\textsf{SI}, I^\textsf{SI}, \mathbf{J}^\textsf{SI},\mathbf{P}^\textsf{SI},\mathbf{p}^\textsf{SI}\right)$	$\left(q^\textsf{HL}, \rho^\textsf{HL}, I^\textsf{HL}, \mathbf{J}^\textsf{HL},\mathbf{P}^\textsf{HL}, \mathbf{p}^\textsf{HL}\right)$	$\sqrt{4\pi} \left(q^\textsf{G}, \rho^\textsf{G}, I^\textsf{G}, \mathbf{J}^\textsf{G},\mathbf{P}^\textsf{G}, \mathbf{p}^\textsf{G}\right)$
magnetic B field, magnetic flux, magnetic vector potential	$\frac{1}{\sqrt{\mu_0}}\left(\mathbf{B}^\textsf{SI}, \Phi_\text{m}^\textsf{SI},\mathbf{A}^\textsf{SI}\right)$	$\left(\mathbf{B}^\textsf{HL}, \Phi_\text{m}^\textsf{HL},\mathbf{A}^\textsf{HL}\right)$	$\frac{1}{\sqrt{4\pi}} \left(\mathbf{B}^\textsf{G}, \Phi_\text{m}^\textsf{G},\mathbf{A}^\textsf{G}\right)$
magnetic H field	$\sqrt{\mu_0}\ \mathbf{H}^\textsf{SI}$	$\mathbf{H}^\textsf{HL}$	$\frac{1}{\sqrt{4\pi}} \mathbf{H}^\textsf{G}$
magnetic moment, magnetization	$\sqrt{\mu_0}\left(\mathbf{m}^\textsf{SI}, \mathbf{M}^\textsf{SI}\right)$	$\left(\mathbf{m}^\textsf{HL}, \mathbf{M}^\textsf{HL}\right)$	$\sqrt{4\pi} \left(\mathbf{m}^\textsf{G}, \mathbf{M}^\textsf{G}\right)$
relative permittivity, relative permeability	$\left(\frac{\varepsilon^\textsf{SI}}{\varepsilon_0}, \frac{\mu^\textsf{SI}}{\mu_0}\right)$	$\left(\varepsilon^\textsf{HL}, \mu^\textsf{HL}\right)$	$\left(\varepsilon^\textsf{G}, \mu^\textsf{G}\right)$
electric susceptibility, magnetic susceptibility	$\left(\chi_\text{e}^\textsf{SI}, \chi_\text{m}^\textsf{SI}\right)$	$\left(\chi_\text{e}^\textsf{HL}, \chi_\text{m}^\textsf{HL}\right)$	$4\pi \left(\chi_\text{e}^\textsf{G}, \chi_\text{m}^\textsf{G}\right)$
conductivity, conductance, capacitance	$\frac{1}{\varepsilon_0}\left(\sigma^\textsf{SI},S^\textsf{SI},C^\textsf{SI}\right)$	$\left(\sigma^\textsf{HL}, S^\textsf{HL}, C^\textsf{HL}\right)$	$4\pi \left(\sigma^\textsf{G}, S^\textsf{G}, C^\textsf{G}\right)$
resistivity, resistance, inductance	$\varepsilon_0\left(\rho^\textsf{SI},R^\textsf{SI},L^\textsf{SI}\right)$	$\left(\rho^\textsf{HL},R^\textsf{HL},L^\textsf{HL}\right)$	$\frac{1}{4\pi} \left(\rho^\textsf{G},R^\textsf{G},L^\textsf{G}\right)$

As an example, starting with the equation
$$\nabla \cdot \mathbf{E}^\textsf{SI} = \rho^\textsf{SI}/\varepsilon_0 ,$$
and the equations from the table
$$\begin{align}
\sqrt{\varepsilon_0} \, \mathbf{E}^\textsf{SI}   &= \mathbf{E}^\textsf{HL} \\
\frac{1}{\sqrt{\varepsilon_0}} \rho^\textsf{SI} &= \rho^\textsf{HL} \,.
\end{align}$$

Moving the factor across in the latter identities and substituting, the result is
$$\nabla \cdot \left(\frac{1}{\sqrt{\varepsilon_0}} \mathbf{E}^\textsf{HL}\right) = \left(\sqrt{\varepsilon_0} \rho^\textsf{HL}\right)/\varepsilon_0 ,$$
which then simplifies to
$$\nabla \cdot \mathbf{E}^\textsf{HL} = \rho^\textsf{HL} .$$

The foregoing table assumes that mechanical quantities are unaltered by the substitution rules of the table. In translating formulas from SI to Heaviside–Lorentz, however, a great simplification of the rules can be effected by abandoning this assumption, as in the following translation scheme.

Mechanical quantities that are invariant:

l, F, W

Mechanical quantities that are multiplied by c:

t, p

Mechanical quantities that are multiplied by c^{2}:

m

Mechanical quantities that are divided by c:

v, P

Mechanical quantities that are divided by c^{2}:

a

Electromagnetic quantities that are deleted (or replaced by 1):

ε_{0}, μ_{0}

Electromagnetic quantities that are invariant:

ε, μ, q, ρ, E, D, H, B, P, M, p, m, Φ_{e}, Φ_{m}, χ_{e}, χ_{m}, V, V_{m}, A, C, R_{m}

Electromagnetic quantities that are multiplied by c:

R

Electromagnetic quantities that are multiplied by c^{2}:

L

Electromagnetic quantities that are divided by c:

I, J, σ

As an example, the SI form of the Ampère–Maxwell equation in free space is

$$\nabla \times \mathbf{B} = \mu_0 \left( \mathbf{J} + \varepsilon_0\frac{\partial \mathbf{E}} {\partial t} \right)$$.

The translation scheme instructs one to delete ε_{0} and μ_{0}, replace t and J by ct and J/c respectively, and leave E and B unchanged. Doing so immediately results in the Heaviside–Lorentz form of the equation:

$$\nabla \times \mathbf{B} = \frac{1}{c}\mathbf{J} + \frac{1}{c}\frac{\partial \mathbf{E}} {\partial t}$$.

In a great many cases (including all those in the present article) the Heaviside–Lorentz equation can similarly be immediately derived from the SI equation by inspection, without any simplification.

On the other hand, application of the rules of the table to the SI form of the Ampère–Maxwell equation results in the equation

$$\sqrt{\mu_0} \, \nabla \times \mathbf{B} = \mu_0 \left( \sqrt{\varepsilon_0} \, \mathbf{J} + \varepsilon_0\frac{1}{\sqrt{\varepsilon_0}}\frac{\partial \mathbf{E}} {\partial t} \right)$$.

This must be simplified to yield

$$\nabla \times \mathbf{B} = \sqrt{\varepsilon_0\mu_0} \left( \mathbf{J} + \frac{\partial \mathbf{E}} {\partial t} \right)$$.

One must then resort to the final substitution rule mentioned at the head of the table, according to which ε_{0}μ_{0} must be replaced by 1/c^{2}. The resulting equation must then be simplified and expanded to yield the Heaviside–Lorentz form of the equation.
