= Abcoulomb =

Basic unit of electric charge in the CGS-emu system

abcoulomb
- Unit system: CGS electromagnetic units
- Symbol: abC, aC
- Named after: Charles-Augustin de Coulomb
- Derivation: abA⋅s

Conversions
1 abC in ...	... is equal to ...
- CGS base units: g^{1/2}⋅cm^{1/2}
- SI units: 10 C
- CGS electrostatic units: 2.997925×10^{11} statC
- Gaussian units: 2.997925×10^{11} Fr

The abcoulomb (abC or aC) or electromagnetic unit of charge (emu of charge) is the derived physical unit of electric charge in the cgs-emu system of units. One abcoulomb is equal to ten coulombs.

The name "abcoulomb" was introduced by Kennelly in 1903 as a short form of (absolute) electromagnetic cgs unit of charge that was in use since the adoption of the cgs system in 1875. The abcoulomb was coherent with the cgs-emu system, in contrast to the coulomb, the practical unit of charge that had been adopted too in 1875.

CGS-emu (or "electromagnetic cgs") units are one of several systems of electromagnetic units within the centimetre gram second system of units; others include CGS-esu, Gaussian units, and Heaviside–Lorentz units. In these other systems, the abcoulomb is not used; CGS-esu and Gaussian units use the statcoulomb instead, while the Heaviside–Lorentz unit of charge has no specific name.

In the electromagnetic cgs system, electric current is a fundamental quantity defined via Ampère's law and takes the permeability as a dimensionless quantity (relative permeability) whose value in a vacuum is unity. As a consequence, the square of the speed of light appears explicitly in some of the equations interrelating quantities in this system.

The definition of the abcoulomb follows from that of the abampere: given two parallel currents of one abampere separated by one centimetre, the force per distance of wire is 2 dyn/cm. The abcoulomb is the charge flowing in 1 second given a current of 1 abampere.
