= Gaussian units =

Variant of the centimetre–gram–second unit system

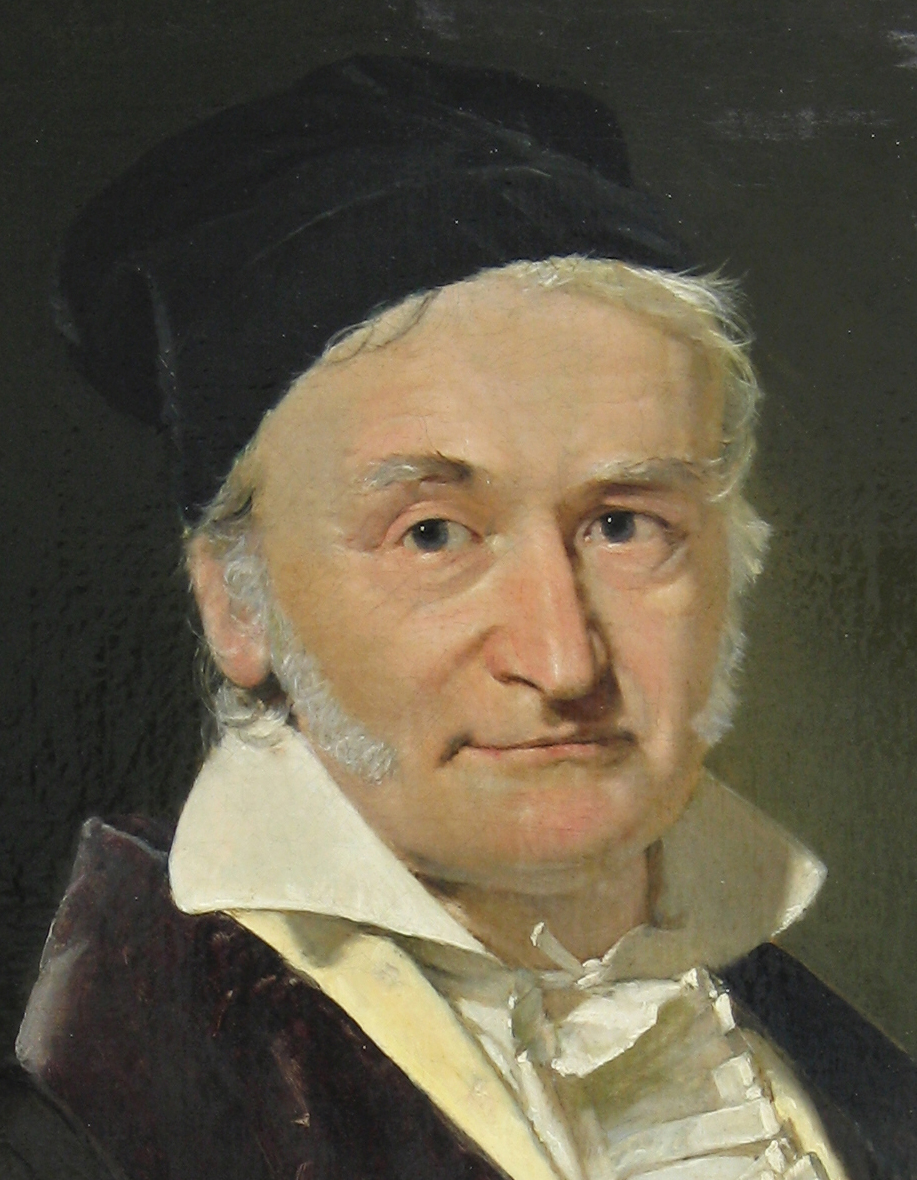
Carl Friedrich Gauss

Gaussian units constitute a metric system of units of measurement. This system is the most common of the several electromagnetic unit systems based on the centimetre–gram–second system of units (CGS). It is also called the Gaussian unit system, Gaussian-cgs units, or often just cgs units. (Note: One of many examples of using the term "cgs units" to refer to Gaussian units is: Lecture notes from Stanford University) The term "cgs units" is ambiguous and therefore to be avoided if possible: there are several variants of CGS, which have conflicting definitions of electromagnetic quantities and units.

SI units predominate in most fields, and continue to increase in popularity at the expense of Gaussian units. (Note: For example, one widely used graduate electromagnetism textbook is Classical Electrodynamics by J. D. Jackson. The second edition, published in 1975, used Gaussian units exclusively, but the third edition, published in 1998, uses mostly SI units. Similarly, Electricity and Magnetism by Edward Purcell is a popular undergraduate textbook. The second edition, published in 1984, used Gaussian units, while the third edition, published in 2013, switched to SI units.) Alternative unit systems also exist. Conversions between quantities in the Gaussian and SI systems are not direct unit conversions, because the quantities themselves are defined differently in each system. This means that the equations that express physical laws of electromagnetism—such as Maxwell's equations—will change depending on the system of quantities that is employed. As an example, quantities that are dimensionless in one system may have dimension in the other.

== Alternative unit systems ==
The Gaussian unit system is just one of several electromagnetic unit systems within CGS. Others include "electrostatic units", "electromagnetic units", and Heaviside–Lorentz units.

Some other unit systems are called "natural units", a category that includes atomic units, Planck units, and others.

The International System of Units (SI), with the associated International System of Quantities (ISQ) (Note: This gives base quantities to which SI units are associated, for example, the SI unit Kelvin for the ISQ base quantity thermodynamic temperature.), is by far the most common system of units today. In engineering and practical areas, SI is nearly universal and has been for decades. In technical, scientific literature (such as theoretical physics and astronomy), Gaussian units were predominant until recent decades, but are now getting progressively less so. The 8th SI Brochure mentions the CGS-Gaussian unit system, but the 9th SI Brochure makes no mention of CGS systems.

Natural units may be used in more theoretical and abstract fields of physics, particularly particle physics and string theory.

== Major differences between Gaussian and SI systems ==
=== Rationalized unit systems ===
One difference between the Gaussian and SI systems is in the placement of factors of 4π in electromagnetic formulas. With SI units, Maxwell's equations have no explicit factors of 4π in the formulae, whereas the inverse-square force laws – Coulomb's law and the Biot–Savart law – do have a factor of 4π attached to the r^{2}. Unit systems with the $4\pi$ in these places are called rationalized. Heaviside–Lorentz units are also rationalized, but like Gaussian units, do not include the constants $\epsilon_0$and $\mu_0$. With Gaussian units, called unrationalized, the situation is reversed: two of Maxwell's equations have factors of 4π, while the inverse-square force laws, Coulomb's law and the Biot–Savart law, have no factor of 4π attached to r^{2} in the denominator. This was recognized as undesirable by Oliver Heaviside, since factors of $4\pi$ do appear in formulas which don't involve spherical geometry, but don't appear in formulas which do involve spherical geometry. For instance, in SI and Heaviside-Lorentz units, 4πr^{2} is the surface area of the sphere of radius r, which is the area of the equipotential surface corresponding to the observation point. For details, see the articles Relation between Gauss's law and Coulomb's law and Inverse-square law.

=== Unit of charge ===
A major difference between the Gaussian system and the ISQ is in the respective definitions of the quantity charge. In the ISQ, a separate base dimension, electric current, with the associated SI unit, the ampere, is associated with electromagnetic phenomena, with the consequence that a unit of electrical charge (1 coulomb = 1 ampere × 1 second) is a physical quantity that cannot be expressed purely in terms of the mechanical units (kilogram, metre, second). On the other hand, in the Gaussian system, the unit of electric charge (the statcoulomb, statC) can be written entirely as a dimensional combination of the non-electrical base units (gram, centimetre, second), as:

1 statC = 1 g^{1/2}⋅cm^{3/2}⋅s^{−1}.

For example, Coulomb's law in Gaussian units has no constant:
$$F = \frac{Q^{_\mathrm{G}}_1 Q^{_\mathrm{G}}_2}{r^2} ,$$
where F is the repulsive force between two electrical charges, Q^{G}_{1} and Q^{G}_{2} are the two charges in question, and r is the distance separating them. If Q^{G}_{1} and Q^{G}_{2} are expressed in statC and r in centimetres, then the unit of F that is coherent with these units is the dyne.

The same law in the ISQ is:
$$F = \frac{1}{4\pi\varepsilon_0} \frac{Q^{_\mathrm{I}}_1 Q^{_\mathrm{I}}_2}{r^2}$$
where ε_{0} is the vacuum permittivity, a quantity that is not dimensionless: it has dimension (charge)^{2} (time)^{2} (mass)^{−1} (length)^{−3}. Without ε_{0}, the equation would be dimensionally inconsistent with the quantities as defined in the ISQ, whereas the quantity ε_{0} does not appear in Gaussian equations. This is an example of how some dimensional physical constants can be eliminated from the expressions of physical law by the choice of definition of quantities. In the ISQ, 1/ε_{0} converts or scales electric flux density, D, to the corresponding electric field, E (the latter has dimension of force per charge), while in the Gaussian system, electric flux density is the same quantity as electric field strength in free space aside from a dimensionless constant factor.

In the Gaussian system, the speed of light c appears directly in electromagnetic formulas like Maxwell's equations (see below), whereas in the ISQ it appears via the product μ_{0}ε_{0} = 1/c^{2}.

=== Units for magnetism ===
In the Gaussian system, unlike the ISQ, the electric field E^{G} and the magnetic field B^{G} have the same dimension. This amounts to a factor of c between how B is defined in the two unit systems, on top of the other differences. (The same factor applies to other magnetic quantities such as the magnetic field, H, and magnetization, M.) For example, in a planar light wave in vacuum, |E^{G}(r, t)| = |B^{G}(r, t)| in Gaussian units, while |E^{I}(r, t)| = c |B^{I}(r, t)| in the ISQ.

=== Polarization, magnetization ===
There are further differences between Gaussian system and the ISQ in how quantities related to polarization and magnetization are defined. For one thing, in the Gaussian system, all of the following quantities have the same dimension: E^{G}, D^{G}, P^{G}, B^{G}, H^{G}, and M^{G}. A further point is that the electric and magnetic susceptibility of a material is dimensionless in both the Gaussian system and the ISQ, but a given material will have a different numerical susceptibility in the two systems. (Equation is given below.)

== List of equations ==
This section has a list of the basic formulae of electromagnetism, given in both the Gaussian system and the International System of Quantities (ISQ). Most symbol names are not given; for complete explanations and definitions, please click to the appropriate dedicated article for each equation. A simple conversion scheme for use when tables are not available may be found in Garg (2012). All formulas except otherwise noted are from Ref.

=== Maxwell's equations ===
Here are Maxwell's equations, both in macroscopic and microscopic forms. Only the "differential form" of the equations is given, not the "integral form"; to get the integral forms, apply the divergence theorem or Kelvin–Stokes theorem.

Maxwell's equations in Gaussian system and ISQ
Name	Gaussian system	ISQ
Gauss's law (macroscopic)	$\nabla \cdot \mathbf{D}^{_\mathrm{G}} = 4\pi\rho_\mathrm{f}^{_\mathrm{G}}$	$\nabla \cdot \mathbf{D}^{_\mathrm{I}} = \rho_\mathrm{f}^{_\mathrm{I}}$
Gauss's law (microscopic)	$\nabla \cdot \mathbf{E}^{_\mathrm{G}} = 4\pi\rho^{_\mathrm{G}}$	$\nabla \cdot \mathbf{E}^{_\mathrm{I}} = \frac{1}{\varepsilon_0} \rho^{_\mathrm{I}}$
Gauss's law for magnetism	$\nabla \cdot \mathbf{B}^{_\mathrm{G}} = 0$	$\nabla \cdot \mathbf{B}^{_\mathrm{I}} = 0$
Maxwell–Faraday equation (Faraday's law of induction)	$\nabla \times \mathbf{E}^{_\mathrm{G}} + \frac{1}{c}\frac{\partial \mathbf{B}^{_\mathrm{G}}} {\partial t} = 0$	$\nabla \times \mathbf{E}^{_\mathrm{I}} + \frac{\partial \mathbf{B}^{_\mathrm{I}}} {\partial t} = 0$
Ampère–Maxwell equation (macroscopic)	$\nabla \times \mathbf{H}^{_\mathrm{G}} - \frac{1}{c} \frac{\partial \mathbf{D}^{_\mathrm{G}}} {\partial t} = \frac{4\pi}{c}\mathbf{J}_\mathrm{f}^{_\mathrm{G}}$	$\nabla \times \mathbf{H}^{_\mathrm{I}} - \frac{\partial \mathbf{D}^{_\mathrm{I}}} {\partial t}= \mathbf{J}_\mathrm{f}^{_\mathrm{I}}$
Ampère–Maxwell equation (microscopic)	$\nabla \times \mathbf{B}^{_\mathrm{G}} - \frac{1}{c}\frac{\partial \mathbf{E}^{_\mathrm{G}}} {\partial t} = \frac{4\pi}{c}\mathbf{J}^{_\mathrm{G}}$	$\nabla \times \mathbf{B}^{_\mathrm{I}} - \frac{1}{c^2}\frac{\partial \mathbf{E}^{_\mathrm{I}}} {\partial t} = \mu_0\mathbf{J}^{_\mathrm{I}}$

=== Other basic laws ===
Other electromagnetic laws in Gaussian system and ISQ
Name	Gaussian system	ISQ
Lorentz force	$\mathbf{F} = q^{_\mathrm{G}}\,\left(\mathbf{E}^{_\mathrm{G}}+\tfrac{1}{c}\,\mathbf{v}\times\mathbf{B}^{_\mathrm{G}}\right)$	$\mathbf{F} = q^{_\mathrm{I}}\,\left(\mathbf{E}^{_\mathrm{I}}+\mathbf{v}\times\mathbf{B}^{_\mathrm{I}}\right)$
Coulomb's law	$\mathbf{F} = \frac{q^{_\mathrm{G}}_1 q^{_\mathrm{G}}_2}{r^2}\,\mathbf{\hat r}$	$\mathbf{F} = \frac{1}{4\pi\varepsilon_0}\,\frac{q^{_\mathrm{I}}_1 q^{_\mathrm{I}}_2}{r^2}\, \mathbf{\hat r}$
Electric field of stationary point charge	$\mathbf{E}^{_\mathrm{G}} = \frac{q^{_\mathrm{G}}}{r^2}\,\mathbf{\hat r}$	$\mathbf{E}^{_\mathrm{I}} = \frac{1}{4\pi\varepsilon_0}\,\frac{q^{_\mathrm{I}}}{r^2}\,\mathbf{\hat r}$
Biot–Savart law	$\mathbf{B}^{_\mathrm{G}} = \frac{1}{c}\!\oint\frac{I^{_\mathrm{G}} \times \mathbf{\hat r}}{r^2}\,\operatorname{d}\!\mathbf{\boldsymbol{\ell}}$	$\mathbf{B}^{_\mathrm{I}} = \frac{\mu_0}{4\pi}\!\oint\frac{I^{_\mathrm{I}} \times \mathbf{\hat r}}{r^2}\,\operatorname{d}\!\mathbf{\boldsymbol{\ell}}$
Poynting vector (microscopic)	$\mathbf{S} = \frac{c}{4\pi}\,\mathbf{E}^{_\mathrm{G}} \times \mathbf{B}^{_\mathrm{G}}$	$\mathbf{S} = \frac{1}{\mu_0}\,\mathbf{E}^{_\mathrm{I}} \times \mathbf{B}^{_\mathrm{I}}$

=== Dielectric and magnetic materials ===
Below are the expressions for the various fields in a dielectric medium. It is assumed here for simplicity that the medium is homogeneous, linear, isotropic, and nondispersive, so that the permittivity is a simple constant.

Expressions for fields in dielectric media
Gaussian system	ISQ
$\mathbf{D}^{_\mathrm{G}} = \mathbf{E}^{_\mathrm{G}}+4\pi\mathbf{P}^{_\mathrm{G}}$	$\mathbf{D}^{_\mathrm{I}} = \varepsilon_0 \mathbf{E}^{_\mathrm{I}}+\mathbf{P}^{_\mathrm{I}}$
$\mathbf{P}^{_\mathrm{G}} = \chi^{_\mathrm{G}}_\mathrm{e}\mathbf{E}^{_\mathrm{G}}$	$\mathbf{P}^{_\mathrm{I}} = \chi^{_\mathrm{I}}_\mathrm{e}\varepsilon_0\mathbf{E}^{_\mathrm{I}}$
$\mathbf{D}^{_\mathrm{G}} = \varepsilon^{_\mathrm{G}}\mathbf{E}^{_\mathrm{G}}$	$\mathbf{D}^{_\mathrm{I}} = \varepsilon^{_\mathrm{I}}\mathbf{E}^{_\mathrm{I}}$
$\varepsilon^{_\mathrm{G}} = 1+4\pi\chi^{_\mathrm{G}}_\mathrm{e}$	$\varepsilon^{_\mathrm{I}}/\varepsilon_0 = 1+\chi^{_\mathrm{I}}_\mathrm{e}$

where

- E and D are the electric field and the displacement field, respectively;
- P is the polarization density;
- $\varepsilon$ is the permittivity;
- $\varepsilon_0$ is the permittivity of vacuum (used in the SI system, but meaningless in Gaussian units); and
- $\chi_\mathrm{e}$ is the electric susceptibility.

The quantities $\varepsilon^{_\mathrm{G}}$ and $\varepsilon^{_\mathrm{I}}/\varepsilon_0$ are both dimensionless, and they have the same numeric value. By contrast, the electric susceptibility $\chi_\mathrm{e}^{_\mathrm{G}}$ and $\chi_\mathrm{e}^{_\mathrm{I}}$ are both unitless, but have different numeric values for the same material:
$$4\pi \chi_\mathrm{e}^{_\mathrm{G}} = \chi_\mathrm{e}^{_\mathrm{I}}\,.$$

Next, here are the expressions for the various fields in a magnetic medium. Again, it is assumed that the medium is homogeneous, linear, isotropic, and nondispersive, so that the permeability is a simple constant.

Expressions for fields in magnetic media
Gaussian system	ISQ
$\mathbf{B}^{_\mathrm{G}} = \mathbf{H}^{_\mathrm{G}}+4\pi\mathbf{M}^{_\mathrm{G}}$	$\mathbf{B}^{_\mathrm{I}} = \mu_0 (\mathbf{H}^{_\mathrm{I}}+\mathbf{M}^{_\mathrm{I}})$
$\mathbf{M}^{_\mathrm{G}} = \chi^{_\mathrm{G}}_\mathrm{m}\mathbf{H}^{_\mathrm{G}}$	$\mathbf{M}^{_\mathrm{I}} = \chi^{_\mathrm{I}}_\mathrm{m}\mathbf{H}^{_\mathrm{I}}$
$\mathbf{B}^{_\mathrm{G}} = \mu^{_\mathrm{G}}\mathbf{H}^{_\mathrm{G}}$	$\mathbf{B}^{_\mathrm{I}} = \mu^{_\mathrm{I}}\mathbf{H}^{_\mathrm{I}}$
$\mu^{_\mathrm{G}} = 1+4\pi\chi^{_\mathrm{G}}_\mathrm{m}$	$\mu^{_\mathrm{I}}/\mu_0 = 1+\chi^{_\mathrm{I}}_\mathrm{m}$

where

- B and H are the magnetic fields;
- M is the magnetization;
- $\mu$ is the magnetic permeability;
- $\mu_0$ is the permeability of vacuum (used in the SI system, but meaningless in Gaussian units); and
- $\chi_\mathrm{m}$ is the magnetic susceptibility.

The quantities $\mu^{_\mathrm{G}}$ and $\mu^{_\mathrm{I}}/\mu_0$ are both dimensionless, and they have the same numeric value. By contrast, the magnetic susceptibility $\chi_\mathrm{m}^{_\mathrm{G}}$ and $\chi_\mathrm{m}^{_\mathrm{I}}$ are both unitless, but has different numeric values in the two systems for the same material:
$$4\pi \chi_\mathrm{m}^{_\mathrm{G}} = \chi_\mathrm{m}^{_\mathrm{I}}$$

=== Vector and scalar potentials ===
The electric and magnetic fields can be written in terms of a vector potential A and a scalar potential ϕ:

Electromagnetic fields in Gaussian system and ISQ
Name	Gaussian system	ISQ
Electric field	$\mathbf{E}^{_\mathrm{G}} = -\nabla\phi^{_\mathrm{G}}-\frac{1}{c}\frac{\partial \mathbf{A}^{_\mathrm{G}}}{\partial t}$	$\mathbf{E}^{_\mathrm{I}} = -\nabla\phi^{_\mathrm{I}}-\frac{\partial \mathbf{A}^{_\mathrm{I}}}{\partial t}$
Magnetic B field	$\mathbf{B}^{_\mathrm{G}} = \nabla \times \mathbf{A}^{_\mathrm{G}}$	$\mathbf{B}^{_\mathrm{I}} = \nabla \times \mathbf{A}^{_\mathrm{I}}$

=== Electrical circuit ===
Electrical circuit values in Gaussian system and ISQ
Name	Gaussian system	ISQ
Charge conservation	$I^{_\mathrm{G}} = \frac{\mathrm{d}Q^{_\mathrm{G}}}{\mathrm{d}t}$	$I^{_\mathrm{I}} = \frac{\mathrm{d}Q^{_\mathrm{I}}}{\mathrm{d}t}$
Lenz's law	$V^{_\mathrm{G}} = \frac{1}{c}\frac{\mathrm{d}\mathrm{\Phi}^{_\mathrm{G}}}{\mathrm{d}t}$	$V^{_\mathrm{I}} = -\frac{\mathrm{d}\mathrm{\Phi}^{_\mathrm{I}}}{\mathrm{d}t}$
Ohm's law	$V^{_\mathrm{G}} = R^{_\mathrm{G}} I^{_\mathrm{G}}$	$V^{_\mathrm{I}} = R^{_\mathrm{I}} I^{_\mathrm{I}}$
Capacitance	$Q^{_\mathrm{G}} = C^{_\mathrm{G}} V^{_\mathrm{G}}$	$Q^{_\mathrm{I}} = C^{_\mathrm{I}} V^{_\mathrm{I}}$
Inductance	$\mathrm{\Phi}^{_\mathrm{G}} = cL^{_\mathrm{G}} I^{_\mathrm{G}}$	$\mathrm{\Phi}^{_\mathrm{I}} = L^{_\mathrm{I}} I^{_\mathrm{I}}$

where

- Q is the electric charge
- I is the electric current
- V is the electric potential
- Φ is the magnetic flux
- R is the electrical resistance
- C is the capacitance
- L is the inductance

=== Fundamental constants ===
Fundamental constants in Gaussian system and ISQ
Name	Gaussian system	ISQ
Impedance of free space	$Z_0^{_\mathrm{G}} = \frac{4\pi}{c}$	$Z_0^{_\mathrm{I}} = \sqrt{\frac{\mu_0}{\varepsilon_0}}$
Electric constant	$1 = \frac{4\pi}{Z_0^{_\mathrm{G}}c}$	$\varepsilon_0 = \frac{1}{Z_0^{_\mathrm{I}}c}$
Magnetic constant	$1 = \frac{Z_0^{_\mathrm{G}}c}{4\pi}$	$\mu_0 = \frac{Z_0^{_\mathrm{I}}}{c}$
Fine-structure constant	$\alpha = \frac{(e^{_\mathrm{G}})^2}{\hbar c}$	$\alpha = \frac{1}{4\pi\varepsilon_0} \frac{(e^{_\mathrm{I}})^2}{\hbar c}$
Magnetic flux quantum	$\phi_0^{_\mathrm{G}} = \frac{hc}{2e^{_\mathrm{G}}}$	$\phi_0^{_\mathrm{I}} = \frac{h}{2e^{_\mathrm{I}}}$
Conductance quantum	$G_0^{_\mathrm{G}} = \frac{2(e^{_\mathrm{G}})^2}{h}$	$G_0^{_\mathrm{I}} = \frac{2(e^{_\mathrm{I}})^2}{h}$
Bohr radius	$a_\mathrm{B} =\frac{\hbar^2}{m_\mathrm{e}(e^{_\mathrm{G}})^2}$	$a_\mathrm{B} =\frac{4\pi\varepsilon_0\hbar^2}{m_\mathrm{e}(e^{_\mathrm{I}})^2}$
Bohr magneton	$\mu_\mathrm{B}^{_\mathrm{G}} =\frac{e^{_\mathrm{G}}\hbar}{2m_\mathrm{e}c}$	$\mu_\mathrm{B}^{_\mathrm{I}} =\frac{e^{_\mathrm{I}}\hbar}{2m_\mathrm{e}}$

== Electromagnetic unit names ==
Table 1: Common electromagnetism units in SI vs Gaussian
Quantity	Symbol	SI unit	Gaussian unit (in base units)	Conversion factor
Electric charge	q	C	Fr (cm^{3/2}⋅g^{1/2}⋅s^{−1})	$\frac{q^{_\mathrm{G}}}{q^{_\mathrm{I}}} = \frac{1}{\sqrt{4\pi\varepsilon_0}} \approx \frac{2.998 \times 10^9 \, \mathrm{Fr}}{1\, \mathrm{C}}$
Electric current	I	A	statA (cm^{3/2}⋅g^{1/2}⋅s^{−2})	$\frac{I^{_\mathrm{G}}}{I^{_\mathrm{I}}} = \frac{1}{\sqrt{4\pi\varepsilon_0}} \approx \frac{2.998 \times 10^9 \, \mathrm{statA}}{1\, \mathrm{A}}$
Electric potential, Voltage	φ V	V	statV (cm^{1/2}⋅g^{1/2}⋅s^{−1})	$\frac{V^{_\mathrm{G}}}{V^{_\mathrm{I}}} = \sqrt{4\pi\varepsilon_0} \approx \frac{1\, \mathrm{statV}}{2.998 \times 10^2 \, \mathrm{V}}$
Electric field	E	V/m	statV/cm (cm^{−1/2}⋅g^{1/2}⋅s^{−1})	$\frac{\mathbf{E}^{_\mathrm{G}}}{\mathbf{E}^{_\mathrm{I}}} = \sqrt{4\pi\varepsilon_0} \approx \frac{1 \, \mathrm{statV/cm}}{2.998 \times 10^4 \, \mathrm{V/m}}$
Electric displacement field	D	C/m^{2}	Fr/cm^{2} (cm^{−1/2}g^{1/2}s^{−1})	$\frac{\mathbf{D}^{_\mathrm{G}}}{\mathbf{D}^{_\mathrm{I}}} = \sqrt{\frac{4\pi}{\varepsilon_0}} \approx \frac{4\pi\times 2.998 \times 10^5 \, \mathrm{Fr/cm}^2}{ 1 \, \mathrm{C/m}^2}$
Electric dipole moment	p	C⋅m	Fr⋅cm (cm^{5/2}⋅g^{1/2}⋅s^{−1})	$\frac{\mathbf{p}^{_\mathrm{G}}}{\mathbf{p}^{_\mathrm{I}}} = \frac{1}{\sqrt{4\pi\varepsilon_0}} \approx \frac{2.998 \times 10^{11} \, \mathrm{Fr}{\cdot}\mathrm{cm}}{1 \, \mathrm{C}{\cdot}\mathrm{m}}$
Electric flux (Note: The quantity here is the flux of the displacement field (D), not the electric field (E).)	Φ_{e}	C	Fr (cm^{3/2}⋅g^{1/2}⋅s^{−1})	$\frac{\Phi^{_\mathrm{G}}_{\mathrm{e}}}{\Phi^{_\mathrm{I}}_{\mathrm{e}}} = \sqrt{\frac{4\pi}{\varepsilon_0}} \approx \frac{4\pi\times 2.998 \times 10^9 \, \mathrm{Fr}}{1 \, \mathrm{C}}$
Permittivity	ε	F/m	cm/cm	$\frac{\varepsilon^{_\mathrm{G}}}{\varepsilon^{_\mathrm{I}}} = \frac{1}{\varepsilon_0} \approx \frac{4\pi \times 2.998^2 \times 10^{9} \, \mathrm{cm/cm}}{1 \, \mathrm{F/m}}$
Magnetic B field	B	T	G (cm^{−1/2}⋅g^{1/2}⋅s^{−1})	$\frac{\mathbf{B}^{_\mathrm{G}}}{\mathbf{B}^{_\mathrm{I}}} = \sqrt{\frac{4\pi}{\mu_0}} \approx \frac{10^4 \, \mathrm{G}}{1 \, \mathrm{T}}$
Magnetic H field	H	A/m	Oe (cm^{−1/2}⋅g^{1/2}⋅s^{−1})	$\frac{\mathbf{H}^{_\mathrm{G}}}{\mathbf{H}^{_\mathrm{I}}} = \sqrt{4\pi\mu_0} \approx \frac{4\pi \times 10^{-3} \, \mathrm{Oe}}{1 \, \mathrm{A/m}}$
Magnetic dipole moment	m	A⋅m^{2}	erg/G (cm^{5/2}⋅g^{1/2}⋅s^{−1})	$\frac{\mathbf{m}^{_\mathrm{G}}}{\mathbf{m}^{_\mathrm{I}}} = \sqrt{\frac{\mu_0}{4\pi}} \approx \frac{10^3 \, \mathrm{erg/G}}{1 \, \mathrm{A}{\cdot}\mathrm{m}^2}$
Magnetic flux	Φ_{m}	Wb	Mx (cm^{3/2}⋅g^{1/2}⋅s^{−1})	$\frac{\Phi^{_\mathrm{G}}_{\mathrm{m}}}{\Phi^{_\mathrm{I}}_{\mathrm{m}}} = \sqrt{\frac{4\pi}{\mu_0}} \approx \frac{10^8 \, \mathrm{Mx}}{1 \, \mathrm{Wb}}$
Permeability	μ	H/m	cm/cm	$\frac{\mu^{_\mathrm{G}}}{\mu^{_\mathrm{I}}} = \frac{1}{\mu_0} \approx \frac{1 \, \mathrm{cm/cm}}{4\pi \times 10^{-7} \, \mathrm{H/m}}$
Magnetomotive force	$\mathcal F$	A	Gi (cm^{1/2}⋅g^{1/2}⋅s^{−1})	$\frac{\mathcal F^{_\mathrm{G}}}{\mathcal F^{_\mathrm{I}}} = \sqrt{4\pi\mu_0} \approx \frac{4\pi \times 10^{-1} \, \mathrm{Gi}}{1 \, \mathrm{A}}$
Magnetic reluctance	$\mathcal R$	H^{−1}	Gi/Mx (cm^{−1})	$\frac{\mathcal R^{_\mathrm{G}}}{\mathcal R^{_\mathrm{I}}} = \mu_0 \approx \frac{4\pi \times 10^{-9} \, \mathrm{Gi/Mx}}{1 \, \mathrm{H}^{-1}}$
Resistance	R	Ω	s/cm	$\frac{R^{_\mathrm{G}}}{R^{_\mathrm{I}}} = 4\pi\varepsilon_0 \approx \frac{1 \, \mathrm{s/cm}}{2.998^2 \times 10^{11} \, \Omega}$
Resistivity	ρ	Ω⋅m	s	$\frac{\rho^{_\mathrm{G}}}{\rho^{_\mathrm{I}}} = 4\pi\varepsilon_0 \approx \frac{1 \, \mathrm{s}}{2.998^2 \times 10^{9} \, \Omega{\cdot}\mathrm{m}}$
Capacitance	C	F	cm	$\frac{C^{_\mathrm{G}}}{C^{_\mathrm{I}}} = \frac{1}{4\pi\varepsilon_0} \approx \frac{2.998^2 \times 10^{11} \, \mathrm{cm}}{1 \, \mathrm{F}}$
Inductance	L	H	s^{2}/cm	$\frac{L^{_\mathrm{G}}}{L^{_\mathrm{I}}} = 4\pi\varepsilon_0 \approx \frac{1 \, \mathrm{s}^2/\mathrm{cm}}{2.998^2 \times 10^{11} \, \mathrm{H}}$

Note: All the equations are in SI, and the quantities $\varepsilon_0$ and $\mu_0$ satisfy $\varepsilon_0\mu_0 = 1/c^2$.

The conversion factors are written both symbolically and numerically. The numerical conversion factors can be derived from the symbolic conversion factors by substitution of equals for equals. For example, the top row says ${1} \,/\, {\sqrt{4\pi\varepsilon_0}} \approx {2.998 \times 10^9 \,\mathrm{Fr}} \,/\, {1\,\mathrm{C}}$, a relation which can be verified by substituting for $\varepsilon_0$ and Fr their values as given in the permittivity row and Gaussian unit column, respectively, and expressing them and C in SI base units.

The equations of the table, including those in the Gaussian unit column and the note but excluding those containing a numerical conversion factor, constitute an interpretation (or model) in the SI of the Gaussian system, both its quantity and unit equations. An interpreted unit equation, however, is not a conversion, which makes use of the excluded equations. For example, the equation q^{G} = 1 Fr is interpreted to mean q^{I}/(4πε_{0})^{1/2} = 10^{−9/2} m^{3/2}⋅kg^{1/2}⋅s^{−1} but is converted to q^{I} = 3.3356 × 10^{−10} C.

A popular interpretation of the SI in the Gaussian system uses the equations q^{I} = q^{G} and 4πε_{0} = 1. The equation q^{I} = 1 C is rewritten as q^{I}/(4πε_{0})^{1/2} = 1 C/(4πε_{0})^{1/2} = 2.9979 × 10^{9/2} m^{3/2}⋅kg^{1/2}⋅s^{−1}, which is interpreted to mean q^{G} = 2.9979 × 10^{9} cm^{3/2}⋅g^{1/2}⋅s^{−1} = 2.9979 × 10^{9} Fr. This model can be derived from Table 1 by substituting ε_{0} = 1/(4π) and μ_{0} = 4π/c^{2}.

Coulomb's law in the unrationalized MKSA system (U) may be modeled in the SI by either of the following triples of equations: (1) q^{U} = q^{I}, C^{U} = C^{I}, and ε^{U} = 4πε^{I}; or (2) q^{U} = q^{I}/(4π)^{1/2}, C^{U} = C^{I}/(4π)^{1/2}, and ε^{U} = ε^{I}. Each triple may be extended to a complete interpretation of the unrationalized MKSA system in the SI. The first interpretation is preferred, and interpretations like it (i.e., in which q is invariant, as in the preceding example) are used to model the SI in electrostatic and electromagnetic units.

It is surprising to think of measuring capacitance in centimetres. One useful example is that a centimetre of capacitance is the capacitance between a sphere of radius 1 cm in vacuum and infinity.

Another surprising unit is measuring resistivity in units of seconds. A physical example is: Take a parallel-plate capacitor, which has a "leaky" dielectric with permittivity 1 but a finite resistivity. After charging it up, the capacitor will discharge itself over time, due to current leaking through the dielectric. If the resistivity of the dielectric is t seconds, the half-life of the discharge is ~0.05 t seconds. This result is independent of the size, shape, and charge of the capacitor, and therefore this example illuminates the fundamental connection between resistivity and time units.

=== Dimensionally equivalent units ===
A number of the units defined by the table have different names but are in fact dimensionally equivalent – i.e., they have the same expression in terms of the base units cm, g, s. (This is analogous to the distinction in SI between newton-metre and joule.) The different names help avoid ambiguities and misunderstandings as to what physical quantity is being measured. In particular, all of the following quantities are dimensionally equivalent in Gaussian units, but they are nevertheless given different unit names as follows:

Dimensionally equivalent units
Quantity	Gaussian symbol	In Gaussian base units	Gaussian unit of measure
Electric field	E^{G}	cm^{−1/2}⋅g^{1/2}⋅s^{−1}	statV/cm
Electric displacement field	D^{G}	cm^{−1/2}⋅g^{1/2}⋅s^{−1}	statC/cm^{2}
Polarization density	P^{G}	cm^{−1/2}⋅g^{1/2}⋅s^{−1}	statC/cm^{2}
Magnetic flux density	B^{G}	cm^{−1/2}⋅g^{1/2}⋅s^{−1}	G
Magnetizing field	H^{G}	cm^{−1/2}⋅g^{1/2}⋅s^{−1}	Oe
Magnetization	M^{G}	cm^{−1/2}⋅g^{1/2}⋅s^{−1}	dyn/Mx

== General rules to translate a formula ==
Any formula can be converted between Gaussian and SI units by using the symbolic conversion factors from Table 1 above.

For example, the electric field of a stationary point charge has the ISQ formula
$$\mathbf{E}^{_\mathrm{I}} = \frac{q^{_\mathrm{I}}}{4\pi \varepsilon_0 r^2} \hat{\mathbf{r}} ,$$
where r is distance, and the "I" superscript indicates that the electric field and charge are defined as in the ISQ. If we want the formula to instead use the Gaussian definitions of electric field and charge, we look up how these are related using Table 1, which says:
$$\begin{align}
\frac{\mathbf{E}^{_\mathrm{G}}}{\mathbf{E}^{_\mathrm{I}}} &= \sqrt{4\pi\varepsilon_0}\,, \\
\frac{q^{_\mathrm{G}}}{q^{_\mathrm{I}}} &= \frac{1}{\sqrt{4\pi\varepsilon_0}}\,.
\end{align}$$

Therefore, after substituting and simplifying, we get the Gaussian-system formula:
$$\mathbf{E}^{_\mathrm{G}} = \frac{q^{_\mathrm{G}}}{r^2}\hat{\mathbf{r}}\,,$$
which is the correct Gaussian-system formula, as mentioned in a previous section.

For convenience, the table below has a compilation of the symbolic conversion factors from Table 1. To convert any formula from the Gaussian system to the ISQ using this table, replace each symbol in the Gaussian column by the corresponding expression in the SI column (vice versa to convert the other way). Replace $1/c^2$ by $\varepsilon_0 \mu_0$ (or vice versa). This will reproduce any of the specific formulas given in the list above, such as Maxwell's equations, as well as any other formula not listed. (Note: For some examples of how to use this table, see: Units in Electricity and Magnetism. See the section "Conversion of Gaussian formulae into SI" and the subsequent text.)

Table 2A: Replacement rules for translating formulas from Gaussian to ISQ
Name	Gaussian system	ISQ
electric field, electric potential, electromotive force	$\left(\mathbf{E}^{_\mathrm{G}}, \varphi^{_\mathrm{G}}, \mathcal E^{_\mathrm{G}}\right)$	$\sqrt{4\pi\varepsilon_0}\left(\mathbf{E}^{_\mathrm{I}}, \varphi^{_\mathrm{I}}, \mathcal E^{_\mathrm{I}}\right)$
electric displacement field	$\mathbf{D}^{_\mathrm{G}}$	$\sqrt{\frac{4\pi}{\varepsilon_0}}\mathbf{D}^{_\mathrm{I}}$
charge, charge density, current, current density, polarization density, electric dipole moment	$\left(q^{_\mathrm{G}}, \rho^{_\mathrm{G}}, I^{_\mathrm{G}}, \mathbf{J}^{_\mathrm{G}},\mathbf{P}^{_\mathrm{G}}, \mathbf{p}^{_\mathrm{G}}\right)$	$\frac{1}{\sqrt{4\pi\varepsilon_0}}\left(q^{_\mathrm{I}}, \rho^{_\mathrm{I}}, I^{_\mathrm{I}}, \mathbf{J}^{_\mathrm{I}},\mathbf{P}^{_\mathrm{I}},\mathbf{p}^{_\mathrm{I}}\right)$
magnetic B field, magnetic flux, magnetic vector potential	$\left(\mathbf{B}^{_\mathrm{G}}, \Phi_\mathrm{m}^{_\mathrm{G}},\mathbf{A}^{_\mathrm{G}}\right)$	$\sqrt{\frac{4\pi}{\mu_0}}\left(\mathbf{B}^{_\mathrm{I}}, \Phi_\mathrm{m}^{_\mathrm{I}},\mathbf{A}^{_\mathrm{I}}\right)$
magnetic H field, magnetic scalar potential, magnetomotive force	$\left(\mathbf{H}^{_\mathrm{G}}, \psi^{_\mathrm{G}}, \mathcal F^{_\mathrm{G}}\right)$	$\sqrt{4\pi\mu_0}\left(\mathbf{H}^{_\mathrm{I}}, \psi^{_\mathrm{I}}, \mathcal F^{_\mathrm{I}}\right)$
magnetic moment, magnetization, magnetic pole strength	$\left(\mathbf{m}^{_\mathrm{G}}, \mathbf{M}^{_\mathrm{G}}, p^{_\mathrm{G}}\right)$	$\sqrt{\frac{\mu_0}{4\pi}}\left(\mathbf{m}^{_\mathrm{I}}, \mathbf{M}^{_\mathrm{I}}, p^{_\mathrm{I}}\right)$
permittivity, permeability	$\left(\varepsilon^{_\mathrm{G}}, \mu^{_\mathrm{G}}\right)$	$\left(\frac{\varepsilon^{_\mathrm{I}}}{\varepsilon_0}, \frac{\mu^{_\mathrm{I}}}{\mu_0}\right)$
electric susceptibility, magnetic susceptibility	$\left(\chi_\mathrm{e}^{_\mathrm{G}}, \chi_\mathrm{m}^{_\mathrm{G}}\right)$	$\frac{1}{4\pi}\left(\chi_\mathrm{e}^{_\mathrm{I}}, \chi_\mathrm{m}^{_\mathrm{I}}\right)$
conductivity, conductance, capacitance	$\left(\sigma^{_\mathrm{G}}, S^{_\mathrm{G}}, C^{_\mathrm{G}}\right)$	$\frac{1}{4\pi\varepsilon_0}\left(\sigma^{_\mathrm{I}},S^{_\mathrm{I}},C^{_\mathrm{I}}\right)$
resistivity, resistance, inductance, memristance, impedance	$\left(\rho^{_\mathrm{G}},R^{_\mathrm{G}},L^{_\mathrm{G}},M^{_\mathrm{G}},Z^{_\mathrm{G}}\right)$	$4\pi\varepsilon_0\left(\rho^{_\mathrm{I}},R^{_\mathrm{I}},L^{_\mathrm{I}},M^{_\mathrm{I}},Z^{_\mathrm{I}}\right)$
magnetic reluctance	$\mathcal{R}^{_\mathrm{G}}$	$\mu_0\mathcal{R}^{_\mathrm{I}}$

Table 2B: Replacement rules for translating formulas from ISQ to Gaussian
Name	ISQ	Gaussian system
electric field, electric potential, electromotive force	$\left(\mathbf{E}^{_\mathrm{I}}, \varphi^{_\mathrm{I}}, \mathcal E^{_\mathrm{I}}\right)$	$\frac{1}{\sqrt{4\pi\varepsilon_0}}\left(\mathbf{E}^{_\mathrm{G}}, \varphi^{_\mathrm{G}}, \mathcal E^{_\mathrm{G}}\right)$
electric displacement field	$\mathbf{D}^{_\mathrm{I}}$	$\sqrt{\frac{\varepsilon_0}{4\pi}}\mathbf{D}^{_\mathrm{G}}$
charge, charge density, current, current density, polarization density, electric dipole moment	$\left(q^{_\mathrm{I}}, \rho^{_\mathrm{I}}, I^{_\mathrm{I}}, \mathbf{J}^{_\mathrm{I}},\mathbf{P}^{_\mathrm{I}}, \mathbf{p}^{_\mathrm{I}}\right)$	$\sqrt{4\pi\varepsilon_0}\left(q^{_\mathrm{G}}, \rho^{_\mathrm{G}}, I^{_\mathrm{G}}, \mathbf{J}^{_\mathrm{G}},\mathbf{P}^{_\mathrm{G}},\mathbf{p}^{_\mathrm{G}}\right)$
magnetic B field, magnetic flux, magnetic vector potential	$\left(\mathbf{B}^{_\mathrm{I}}, \Phi_\mathrm{m}^{_\mathrm{I}},\mathbf{A}^{_\mathrm{I}}\right)$	$\sqrt{\frac{\mu_0}{4\pi}}\left(\mathbf{B}^{_\mathrm{G}}, \Phi_\mathrm{m}^{_\mathrm{G}},\mathbf{A}^{_\mathrm{G}}\right)$
magnetic H field, magnetic scalar potential, magnetomotive force	$\left(\mathbf{H}^{_\mathrm{I}}, \psi^{_\mathrm{I}}, \mathcal F^{_\mathrm{I}}\right)$	$\frac{1}{\sqrt{4\pi\mu_0}}\left(\mathbf{H}^{_\mathrm{G}}, \psi^{_\mathrm{G}}, \mathcal F^{_\mathrm{G}}\right)$
magnetic moment, magnetization, magnetic pole strength	$\left(\mathbf{m}^{_\mathrm{I}}, \mathbf{M}^{_\mathrm{I}}, p^{_\mathrm{I}}\right)$	$\sqrt{\frac{4\pi}{\mu_0}}\left(\mathbf{m}^{_\mathrm{G}}, \mathbf{M}^{_\mathrm{G}}, p^{_\mathrm{G}}\right)$
permittivity, permeability	$\left(\varepsilon^{_\mathrm{I}}, \mu^{_\mathrm{I}}\right)$	$\left(\varepsilon_0\varepsilon^{_\mathrm{G}}, \mu_0\mu^{_\mathrm{G}}\right)$
electric susceptibility, magnetic susceptibility	$\left(\chi_\mathrm{e}^{_\mathrm{I}}, \chi_\mathrm{m}^{_\mathrm{I}}\right)$	$4\pi \left(\chi_\mathrm{e}^{_\mathrm{G}}, \chi_\mathrm{m}^{_\mathrm{G}}\right)$
conductivity, conductance, capacitance	$\left(\sigma^{_\mathrm{I}}, S^{_\mathrm{I}}, C^{_\mathrm{I}}\right)$	$4\pi\varepsilon_0\left(\sigma^{_\mathrm{G}},S^{_\mathrm{G}},C^{_\mathrm{G}}\right)$
resistivity, resistance, inductance, memristance, impedance	$\left(\rho^{_\mathrm{I}},R^{_\mathrm{I}},L^{_\mathrm{I}},M^{_\mathrm{I}},Z^{_\mathrm{I}}\right)$	$\frac{1}{4\pi\varepsilon_0}\left(\rho^{_\mathrm{G}},R^{_\mathrm{G}},L^{_\mathrm{G}},M^{_\mathrm{G}},Z^{_\mathrm{G}}\right)$
magnetic reluctance	$\mathcal{R}^{_\mathrm{I}}$	$\frac{1}{\mu_0}\mathcal{R}^{_\mathrm{G}}$

After the rules of the table have been applied and the resulting formula has been simplified, replace all combinations $\varepsilon_0 \mu_0$ by $1/c^2$.

No electromagnetic quantities are unaltered by the substitution rules of the foregoing table, and the factors are generally complex. In translating formulas from SI to Gaussian, however, a great simplification of the rules can be effected by using the following popular translation scheme.

All mechanical quantities are invariant, e.g.:

l, F, W, t, p, v, a, P, m

Electromagnetic quantity that is replaced by 1/(4π):

ε_{0}

Electromagnetic quantity that is replaced by 4π/c^{2}:

μ_{0}

Electromagnetic quantities that are invariant:

q, ρ, I, J, E, P, p, V, R, σ, C, L

Electromagnetic quantities that are multiplied by 1/(4π):

ε, D, Φ_{e}

Electromagnetic quantities that are multiplied by 4π/c^{2}:

μ

Electromagnetic quantities that are multiplied by 4π:

χ_{e}, χ_{m}

Electromagnetic quantities that are multiplied by c/(4π):

H, V_{m}

Electromagnetic quantities that are multiplied by c^{2}/(4π):

R_{m}

Electromagnetic quantities that are multiplied by c:

M, m

Electromagnetic quantities that are multiplied by 1/c:

B, Φ_{m}, A

As an example, the SI form of the Ampère–Maxwell equation in free space is

$$\nabla \times \mathbf{B} = \mu_0 \left( \mathbf{J} + \varepsilon_0\frac{\partial \mathbf{E}} {\partial t} \right)$$.

The translation scheme instructs one to replace ε_{0} by 1/(4π), μ_{0} by 4π/c^{2}, B by B/c, and leave E and J unchanged. Doing so results in the equation

$$\frac{1}{c}\nabla \times \mathbf{B} = \frac{4\pi}{c^2} \left( \mathbf{J} + \frac{1}{4\pi}\frac{\partial \mathbf{E}} {\partial t} \right)$$.

This must be simplified to yield the Gaussian form of the equation:

$$\nabla \times \mathbf{B} = \frac{4\pi}{c}\mathbf{J} + \frac{1}{c}\frac{\partial \mathbf{E}} {\partial t}$$.

On the other hand, application of the rules of the table to the SI form of the Ampère–Maxwell equation results in the equation

$$\sqrt{\frac{\mu_0}{4\pi}}\nabla \times \mathbf{B} = \mu_0 \left( \sqrt{4\pi\varepsilon_0} \, \mathbf{J} + \varepsilon_0\frac{1}{\sqrt{4\pi\varepsilon_0}}\frac{\partial \mathbf{E}} {\partial t} \right)$$.

This must be simplified to yield

$$\nabla \times \mathbf{B} = \sqrt{\varepsilon_0\mu_0} \left( 4\pi\mathbf{J} + \frac{\partial \mathbf{E}} {\partial t} \right)$$.

One must then resort to the final substitution rule mentioned at the foot of the table, according to which ε_{0}μ_{0} must be replaced by 1/c^{2}. The resulting equation must then be simplified and expanded to yield the Gaussian form of the equation.
