= Statampere =

Unit of electric current

statampere
- Unit system: CGS-ESU and Gaussian^{:278}
- Unit of: electric current^{:278}
- Symbol: statA^{:278}
- Named after: A.-M. Ampère
- In CGS base units: g^{1/2}⋅cm^{3/2}⋅s^{−2} ^{:26}

Conversions
1 statA in ...	... corresponds to ...
- SI base units: 10/c_{cgs} ampere ≈ 3.33564×10^{−10} ampere (Note: The dimensionless constant c_{cgs} = 2.99792458×10^{10} is numerically equal to the magnitude of the speed of light when the latter is expressed in cm/s.)^{:16}^{:26}
- CGS-EMU: 1/c_{cgs} abampere ≈3.33564×10^{−11} abampere^{:16}

The statampere (statA) is the derived electromagnetic unit of electric current in the CGS-ESU (electrostatic cgs) and Gaussian systems of units.^{:278} One statampere corresponds to 10/c_{cgs} ampere ≈ 3.33564×10^{−10} ampere in the SI system of units.

The name statampere is a shortening of abstatampere, where the idea was that the prefix abstat should stand for absolute electrostatic and mean ‘belonging to the CGS-ESU (electrostatic cgs) absolute system of units’. (Note: For quite a long time, the ESU and EMU units didn't have special names; one would just say, e.g. the ESU unit of resistance. It was apparently only in 1903 that A. E. Kennelly suggested that the names of the EMU units be obtained by prefixing the name of the corresponding ‘practical unit' by ‘ab-’ (short for ‘absolute’, giving the ‘abohm’, ‘abvolt’, the ‘abampere’, etc.), and that the names of the ESU units be analogously obtained by using the prefix ‘abstat-’, which was later shortened to ‘stat-’ (giving the ‘statohm’, ‘statvolt’, ‘statampere’, etc.). This naming system was widely used in the U.S., but, apparently, not in Europe.)

The esu-cgs (or "electrostatic cgs") units are one of several systems of electromagnetic units within the centimetre–gram–second system of units; others include CGS-EMU (or "electromagnetic cgs units"), Gaussian units, and Heaviside–Lorentz units. In the cgs-emu system, the unit of electric current is the abampere. The unit of current in the Heaviside–Lorentz system is unnamed.

The other units in the cgs-esu and Gaussian systems related to the statampere are:

- statcoulomb – the charge that passes in one second through any cross-section of a conductor carrying a steady current of one statampere
- statvolt – the electrostatic potential difference such that moving a charge of one statcoulomb through it at constant speed requires one erg of work to be done.
- statohm – the resistance of a conductor that, with a constant current of one statampere through it, maintains between its terminals a potential difference of one statvolt
