= Centimetre–gram–second system of units =

Variant of the metric system

The centimetre–gram–second system of units (CGS or cgs) is a variant of the metric system based on the centimetre as the unit of length, the gram as the unit of mass, and the second as the unit of time. All CGS mechanical units are unambiguously derived from these three base units, but there are several different ways in which the CGS system was extended to cover electromagnetism.

The CGS system has mainly been supplanted by the MKS system based on the metre, kilogram, and second, which was in turn extended and replaced by the International System of Units (SI). In many fields of science and engineering, SI is the only system of units in use, but CGS is still prevalent in certain subfields.

In measurements of purely mechanical systems (involving units of length, mass, force, energy, pressure, and so on), the differences between CGS and SI are straightforward: the unit-conversion factors are all powers of 10 as 100 cm = 1 m and 1000 g = 1 kg. For example, the CGS unit of force is the dyne, which is defined as 1 g⋅cm/s^{2}, so the SI unit of force, the newton (1 kg⋅m/s^{2}), is equal to 100000 dynes.

In contrast, converting measurements of electromagnetic quantities—such as electric charge, electric and magnetic fields, and voltage—between CGS and SI systems is considerably more complex. This is because the form of the equations governing electromagnetic phenomena, including Maxwell's equations, depends on the system of units employed; electromagnetic quantities are defined differently in SI and in CGS. Moreover, several distinct versions of the CGS system exist, each defining electromagnetic units differently. These include the electrostatic (ESU), electromagnetic (EMU), Gaussian units, and Heaviside–Lorentz units. Gaussian units are the most widely used in modern scientific literature, and the term "CGS units" is often understood to refer specifically to the CGS–Gaussian system.

== History ==
The CGS system goes back to a proposal in 1832 by the German mathematician Carl Friedrich Gauss to base a system of absolute units on the three fundamental units of length, mass and time. Gauss chose the units of millimetre, milligram and second. In 1873, a committee of the British Association for the Advancement of Science, including physicists James Clerk Maxwell and William Thomson, 1st Baron Kelvin recommended the general adoption of centimetre, gram and second as fundamental units, and to express all derived electromagnetic units in these fundamental units, using the prefix "C.G.S. unit of ...".

The sizes of many CGS units turned out to be inconvenient for practical purposes. For example, many everyday objects are hundreds or thousands of centimetres long, such as humans, rooms and buildings. Thus the CGS system never gained wide use outside the field of science. Starting in the 1880s, and more significantly by the mid-20th century, CGS was gradually superseded internationally for scientific purposes by the MKS (metre–kilogram–second) system, which in turn developed into the modern SI standard.

Since the international adoption of the MKS standard in the 1940s and the SI standard in the 1960s, the technical use of CGS units has gradually declined worldwide. CGS units have been deprecated in favour of SI units by NIST, as well as organisations such as the American Physical Society and the International Astronomical Union. SI units are predominantly used in engineering applications and physics education, while Gaussian CGS units are still commonly used in theoretical physics, describing microscopic systems, relativistic electrodynamics, and astrophysics.

The units gram and centimetre remain useful as noncoherent units within the SI system, as with any other prefixed SI units.

== Definition of CGS units in mechanics ==
In mechanics, the quantities in the CGS and SI systems are defined identically. The two systems differ only in the scale of the three base units (centimetre versus metre and gram versus kilogram, respectively), with the third unit (second) being the same in both systems.

There is a direct correspondence between the base units of mechanics in CGS and SI. Since the formulae expressing the laws of mechanics are the same in both systems and since both systems are coherent, the definitions of all coherent derived units in terms of the base units are the same in both systems, and there is an unambiguous relationship between derived units:

- $v = \frac{dx}{dt}$ (definition of velocity)
- $F = m\frac{d^2x}{dt^2}$ (Newton's second law of motion)
- $E = \int \vec{F}\cdot d\vec{x}$ (energy defined in terms of work)
- $p = \frac{F}{L^2}$ (pressure defined as force per unit area)
- $\eta = \tau/\frac{dv}{dx}$ (dynamic viscosity defined as shear stress per unit velocity gradient).

Thus, for example, the CGS unit of pressure, barye, is related to the CGS base units of length, mass, and time in the same way as the SI unit of pressure, pascal, is related to the SI base units of length, mass, and time:

1 unit of pressure = 1 unit of force / (1 unit of length)^{2} = 1 unit of mass / (1 unit of length × (1 unit of time)^{2})
1 Ba = 1 g/(cm⋅s^{2})
1 Pa = 1 kg/(m⋅s^{2}).

Expressing a CGS derived unit in terms of the SI base units, or vice versa, requires combining the scale factors that relate the two systems:

1 Ba = 1 g/(cm⋅s^{2}) = 10^{−3} kg / (10^{−2}m⋅s^{2}) = 10^{−1} kg/(m⋅s^{2}) = 10^{−1} Pa.

=== Definitions and conversion factors of CGS units in mechanics ===
Quantity	Quantity symbol	CGS unit name	Unit symbol	Unit definition	In SI units
length, position	L, x	centimetre	cm	1/100 of metre	10^{−2} m
mass	m	gram	g	1/1000 of kilogram	10^{−3} kg
time	t	second	s	1 second	1 s
velocity	v	centimetre per second	cm/s	cm/s	10^{−2} m/s
acceleration	a	gal	Gal	cm/s^{2}	10^{−2} m/s^{2}
force	F	dyne	dyn	g⋅cm/s^{2}	10^{−5} N
energy	E	erg	erg	g⋅cm^{2}/s^{2}	10^{−7} J
power	P	erg per second	erg/s	g⋅cm^{2}/s^{3}	10^{−7} W
pressure	p	barye	Ba	g/(cm⋅s^{2})	10^{−1} Pa
dynamic viscosity	μ	poise	P	g/(cm⋅s)	10^{−1} Pa⋅s
kinematic viscosity	ν	stokes	St	cm^{2}/s	10^{−4} m^{2}/s
wavenumber	k	kayser	cm^{−1} or K	cm^{−1}	100 m^{−1}

== Derivation of CGS units in electromagnetism ==
=== CGS approach to electromagnetic units ===
The laws of electromagnetism (specifically, the four Maxwell's equations) are formulated with fundamentally different assumptions in SI and CGS units. The SI system introduces new units to represent concepts such as electric charge, current, and magnetic flux, while CGS avoids adding new units. Rather, CGS represents all electromagnetic quantities by expressing the laws of electromagnetism in purely mechanical units, without introducing further units beyond the centimetre, gram, and second.

For example, in SI the unit of electric current, the ampere (A), was historically defined such that the magnetic force exerted by two infinitely long, thin, parallel wires 1 metre apart and carrying a current of 1 ampere is exactly 2×10^{−7} N/m. This definition results in most SI electromagnetic units being consistent (subject to factors of some integer powers of 10) with those of the CGS-EMU system described in further sections. The ampere is a base unit of the SI system, with the same status as the metre, kilogram, and second. Thus the relationship in the definition of the ampere with the metre and newton is disregarded, and the ampere is not treated as dimensionally equivalent to any combination of other base units. As a result, electromagnetic laws in SI require an additional constant of proportionality (see Vacuum permeability) to relate electromagnetic units to mechanical units. (This constant of proportionality is derivable directly from the above definition of the ampere.) All other electric and magnetic units are derived from these four base units using the most basic common definitions: for example, electric charge q is defined as current I multiplied by time t,
$$q = I \, t,$$
resulting in the unit of electric charge, the coulomb (C), being defined as 1 C = 1 A⋅s.

=== Alternative derivations of CGS units in electromagnetism ===
Electromagnetic relationships to length, time and mass may be derived by several equally appealing methods. Two of them rely on the forces observed on charges. Two fundamental laws relate (seemingly independently of each other) the electric charge or its rate of change (electric current) to a mechanical quantity such as force. They can be written in system-independent form as follows:

- The first is Coulomb's law, $F = k_{\rm C} \frac{q \, q^\prime}{d^2}$, which describes the electrostatic force F between electric charges $q$ and $q^\prime$, separated by distance d. Here $k_{\rm C}$ is a constant which depends on how exactly the unit of charge is derived from the base units.
- The second is Ampère's force law, $\frac{dF}{dL} = 2 k_{\rm A}\frac{I \, I^\prime}{d}$, which describes the magnetic force F per unit length L between currents I and I′ flowing in two straight parallel wires of infinite length, separated by a distance d that is much greater than the wire diameters. Since $I=q/t\,$ and $I^\prime=q^\prime/t$, the constant $k_{\rm A}$ also depends on how the unit of charge is derived from the base units.

Maxwell's theory of electromagnetism relates these two laws to each other. It states that the ratio of the proportionality constants $k_{\rm C}$ and $k_{\rm A}$ must obey $k_{\rm C} / k_{\rm A} = c^2$, where c is the speed of light in vacuum. Therefore, if one derives the unit of charge from Coulomb's law by setting $k_{\rm C}=1$ then Ampère's force law will contain a factor $2/c^2$. Alternatively, deriving the unit of current, and therefore the unit of charge, from Ampère's force law by setting $k_{\rm A} = 1$ or $k_{\rm A} = 1/2$, will lead to a constant factor in Coulomb's law.

Indeed, both of these mutually exclusive approaches have been practiced by users of the CGS system, leading to the two independent and mutually exclusive branches of CGS, described in the subsections below. However, the freedom of choice in deriving electromagnetic units from the units of length, mass, and time is not limited to the definition of charge. While the electric field can be related to the work performed by it on a moving electric charge, the magnetic force is always perpendicular to the velocity of the moving charge, and thus the work performed by the magnetic field on any charge is always zero. This leads to a choice between two laws of magnetism, each relating magnetic field to mechanical quantities and electric charge:

- The first law describes the Lorentz force produced by a magnetic field B on a charge q moving with velocity v:
  $$\mathbf{F} = \alpha_{\rm L} q\;\mathbf{v} \times \mathbf{B}\;.$$
- The second describes the creation of a static magnetic field B by an electric current I of finite length dl at a point displaced by a vector r, known as the Biot–Savart law:
  $$d\mathbf{B} = \alpha_{\rm B}\frac{I d\mathbf{l} \times \mathbf{\hat r}}{r^2}\;,$$
  where r and $\mathbf{\hat r}$ are the length and the unit vector in the direction of vector r respectively.

These two laws can be used to derive Ampère's force law above, resulting in the relationship: $k_{\rm A} = \alpha_{\rm L} \cdot \alpha_{\rm B}\;$. Therefore, if the unit of charge is based on Ampère's force law such that $k_{\rm A} = 1$, it is natural to derive the unit of magnetic field by setting $\alpha_{\rm L} = \alpha_{\rm B}=1\;$. However, if it is not the case, a choice has to be made as to which of the two laws above is a more convenient basis for deriving the unit of magnetic field.

Furthermore, if we wish to describe the electric displacement field D and the magnetic field H in a medium other than vacuum, we need to also define the constants ε_{0} and μ_{0}, which are the vacuum permittivity and permeability, respectively. Then we have (generally) $\mathbf{D} = \varepsilon_0 \mathbf{E} + \lambda \mathbf{P}$ and $\mathbf{H} = \mathbf{B} / \mu_0 - \lambda^\prime \mathbf{M}$, where P and M are polarisation density and magnetisation vectors. The units of P and M are usually so chosen that the factors 𝜆 and 𝜆′ are equal to the "rationalisation constants" $4 \pi \varepsilon_0 k_{\rm C}$ and $4 \pi \alpha_{\rm B} / (\mu_0 \alpha_{\rm L})$, respectively. If the rationalisation constants are equal, then $c^2 = 1 / (\varepsilon_0 \mu_0 \alpha_{\rm L}^2)$. If they are equal to one, then the system is said to be "rationalised": the laws for systems of spherical geometry contain factors of 4π (for example, point charges), those of cylindrical geometry factors of 2π (for example, wires), and those of planar geometry contain no factors of π (for example, parallel-plate capacitors). However, the modern CGS systems, except Heaviside–Lorentz, use 𝜆 = 𝜆′ = 4π, or, equivalently, $\varepsilon_0 k_{\rm C} = \alpha_{\rm B} / (\mu_0 \alpha_{\rm L}) = 1$. Therefore, Gaussian, ESU, and EMU subsystems of CGS (described below) are not rationalised.

=== Various extensions of the CGS system to electromagnetism ===
The table below shows the values of the above constants used in some common CGS subsystems:

System	$k_{\rm C}$	$\alpha_{\rm B}$	$\varepsilon_0$	$\mu_0$	$k_{\rm A}=\frac{k_{\rm C}}{c^2}$	$\alpha_{\rm L}=\frac{k_{\rm C}}{\alpha_{\rm B}c^2}$	$\lambda=4\pi \varepsilon_0 k_{\rm C}$	$\lambda'=\frac{4\pi\alpha_{\rm B}}{\mu_0\alpha_{\rm L}}$
Electrostatic CGS (ESU, esu, or stat-)	1	$\frac{1}{c^2}$	1	$\frac{1}{c^2}$	$\frac{1}{c^2}$	1	4π	4π
Electromagnetic CGS (EMU, emu, or ab-)	c^{2}	1	$\frac{1}{c^2}$	1	1	1	4π	4π
Gaussian CGS	1	$\frac{1}{c}$	1	1	$\frac{1}{c^2}$	$\frac{1}{c}$	4π	4π
Rationalised Gaussian CGS	1	$\frac{1}{c}$	$\frac{1}{4\pi}$	4π	$\frac{1}{c^2}$	$\frac{1}{c}$	1	1
Heaviside–Lorentz CGS	$\frac{1}{4\pi}$	$\frac{1}{4\pi c}$	1	1	$\frac{1}{4\pi c^2}$	$\frac{1}{c}$	1	1
Unrationalised MKSA	$\frac{c^2}{b}$	$\frac{1}{b}$	$\frac{b}{c^2}$	$\frac{1}{b}$	$\frac{1}{b}$	1	4π	4π
SI	$\frac{c^2}{b}$	$\frac{1}{b}$	$\frac{b}{4\pi c^2}$	$\frac{4\pi}{b}$	$\frac{1}{b}$	1	1	1

In the CGS systems c = 2.9979 × 10^{10} cm/s, and in the unrationalised MKSA and SI systems c = 2.9979 × 10^{8} m/s and b ≈ 10^{7} A^{2}/N = 10^{7} m/H.

In each of these systems the quantities called "charge" etc. may be a different quantity; they are distinguished here by a superscript. The corresponding quantities of each system are related through a proportionality constant.

Maxwell's equations can be written in each of these systems as:

System	Gauss's law	Ampère–Maxwell law	Gauss's law for magnetism	Faraday's law
CGS-ESU	$\nabla \cdot \mathbf E^\text{ESU} = 4 \pi \rho^\text{ESU}$	$\nabla \times \mathbf B^\text{ESU} - c^{-2} \dot \mathbf E^\text{ESU} = 4 \pi c^{-2} \mathbf J^\text{ESU}$	$\nabla \cdot \mathbf B^\text{ESU} = 0$	$\nabla \times \mathbf E^\text{ESU} + \dot \mathbf B^\text{ESU} = 0$
CGS-EMU	$\nabla \cdot \mathbf E^\text{EMU} = 4 \pi c^2 \rho^\text{EMU}$	$\nabla \times \mathbf B^\text{EMU} - c^{-2} \dot \mathbf E^\text{EMU} = 4 \pi \mathbf J^\text{EMU}$	$\nabla \cdot \mathbf B^\text{EMU} = 0$	$\nabla \times \mathbf E^\text{EMU} + \dot \mathbf B^\text{EMU} = 0$
CGS-Gaussian	$\nabla \cdot \mathbf E^\text{G} = 4 \pi \rho^\text{G}$	$\nabla \times \mathbf B^\text{G} - c^{-1} \dot \mathbf E^\text{G} = 4 \pi c^{-1} \mathbf J^\text{G}$	$\nabla \cdot \mathbf B^\text{G} = 0$	$\nabla \times \mathbf E^\text{G} + c^{-1} \dot \mathbf B^\text{G} = 0$
CGS-Heaviside–Lorentz	$\nabla \cdot \mathbf E^\text{HL} = \rho^\text{HL}$	$\nabla \times \mathbf B^\text{HL} - c^{-1} \dot \mathbf E^\text{HL} = c^{-1} \mathbf J^\text{HL}$	$\nabla \cdot \mathbf B^\text{HL} = 0$	$\nabla \times \mathbf E^\text{HL} + c^{-1} \dot \mathbf B^\text{HL} = 0$
SI	$\nabla \cdot \mathbf E^\text{SI} = \rho^\text{SI} / \varepsilon_0$	$\nabla \times \mathbf B^\text{SI} - \mu_0\varepsilon_0\dot \mathbf E^\text{SI} = \mu_0 \mathbf J^\text{SI}$	$\nabla \cdot \mathbf B^\text{SI} = 0$	$\nabla \times \mathbf E^\text{SI} + \dot \mathbf B^\text{SI} = 0$

=== Electrostatic units (ESU) ===
In the electrostatic units variant of the CGS system, (CGS-ESU), charge is defined as the quantity that obeys a form of Coulomb's law without a multiplying constant (and current is then defined as charge per unit time):

$$F={q^\text{ESU}_1 q^\text{ESU}_2 \over r^2} .$$

The ESU unit of charge, franklin (Fr), also known as statcoulomb or esu charge, is therefore defined as follows:

two equal point charges spaced 1 centimetre apart are said to be of 1 franklin each if the electrostatic force between them is 1 dyne.

Therefore, in CGS-ESU, a franklin is equal to a centimetre times square root of dyne:

$$\mathrm{1\,Fr = 1\,statcoulomb = 1\,esu\; charge = 1\,dyne^{1/2}{\cdot}cm=1\,g^{1/2}{\cdot}cm^{3/2}{\cdot}s^{-1}} .$$

The unit of current is defined as:

$$\mathrm{1\,Fr/s = 1\,statampere = 1\,esu\; current = 1\,dyne^{1/2}{\cdot}cm{\cdot}s^{-1}=1\,g^{1/2}{\cdot}cm^{3/2}{\cdot}s^{-2}} .$$

In the CGS-ESU system, charge q therefore has the dimension of M^{1/2}L^{3/2}T^{−1}.

Other units in the CGS-ESU system include the statampere (1 statC/s) and statvolt (1 erg/statC).

In CGS-ESU, all electric and magnetic quantities are dimensionally expressible in terms of length, mass, and time, and none has an independent dimension. Such a system of units of electromagnetism, in which the dimensions of all electric and magnetic quantities are expressible in terms of the mechanical dimensions of mass, length, and time, is traditionally called an 'absolute system'.^{:3}

==== ESU notation ====
All electromagnetic units in the CGS-ESU system that do not have proper names are denoted by a corresponding SI name with an attached prefix "stat" or with a separate abbreviation "esu". The franklin was introduced as a fourth ESU base unit; it is not strictly identical with the statcoulomb. (The unit of permittivity is also sometimes used as a fourth base unit.)

=== Electromagnetic units (EMU) ===
In another variant of the CGS system, electromagnetic units (EMU), current is defined via the force existing between two thin, parallel, infinitely long wires carrying it, and charge is then defined as current multiplied by time. (This approach was eventually used to define the SI unit of ampere as well).

The EMU unit of current, biot (Bi), also known as abampere or emu current, is therefore defined as follows:

The biot is that constant current which, if maintained in two straight parallel conductors of infinite length, of negligible circular cross-section, and placed one centimetre apart in vacuum, would produce between these conductors a force equal to two dynes per centimetre of length.

Therefore, in electromagnetic CGS units, a biot is equal to a square root of dyne:

$$\mathrm{1\,Bi = 1\,abampere = 1\,emu\; current= 1\,dyne^{1/2}=1\,g^{1/2}{\cdot}cm^{1/2}{\cdot}s^{-1}}.$$

The unit of charge in CGS EMU is:

$$\mathrm{1\,Bi{\cdot}s = 1\,abcoulomb = 1\,emu\, charge= 1\,dyne^{1/2}{\cdot}s=1\,g^{1/2}{\cdot}cm^{1/2}}.$$

Dimensionally in the CGS-EMU system, charge q is therefore equivalent to M^{1/2}L^{1/2}. Hence, neither charge nor current is an independent physical quantity in the CGS-EMU system.

==== EMU notation ====
All electromagnetic units in the CGS-EMU system that do not have proper names are denoted by a corresponding SI name with an attached prefix "ab" or with a separate abbreviation "emu". The biot was introduced as a fourth EMU base unit; it is not strictly identical with the abampere. (The unit of permeability is also sometimes used as a fourth base unit.) EMU magnetic unit names formed from abampere, biot, or abvolt should not be used for Gaussian units; other names should be used instead, e.g., oersted, gilbert, erg per gauss, and maxwell (abtesla and abweber are rarely used even with EMU).

=== Practical CGS units ===
The practical CGS system is a hybrid system that uses the volt and the ampere as the units of voltage and current respectively. Doing this avoids the inconveniently large and small electrical units that arise in the esu and emu systems. This system was at one time widely used by electrical engineers because the volt and ampere had been adopted as international standard units by the International Electrical Congress of 1881. As well as the volt and ampere, the farad (capacitance), ohm (resistance), coulomb (electric charge), and henry (inductance) are consequently also used in the practical system and are the same as the SI units. The magnetic units are those of the emu system.

The electrical units, other than the volt and ampere, are determined by the requirement that any equation involving only electrical and kinematical quantities that is valid in SI should also be valid in the system. For example, since electric field strength is voltage per unit length, its unit is the volt per centimetre, which is one hundred times the SI unit.

The system is electrically rationalised and magnetically unrationalised; i.e., 𝜆 = 1 and 𝜆′ = 4π, but the above formula for 𝜆 is invalid. A closely related system is the International System of Electric and Magnetic Units, which has a different unit of mass so that the formula for 𝜆′ is invalid. The unit of mass was chosen to remove powers of ten from contexts in which they were considered to be objectionable (e.g., P = VI and F = qE). Inevitably, the powers of ten reappeared in other contexts, but the effect was to make the familiar joule and watt the units of work and power respectively.

The ampere-turn system is constructed in a similar way by considering magnetomotive force and magnetic field strength to be electrical quantities and rationalising the system by dividing the units of magnetic pole strength and magnetisation by 4π. The units of the first two quantities are the ampere and the ampere per centimetre respectively. The unit of magnetic permeability is that of the emu system, and the magnetic constitutive equations are B = (4π/10)μH and B = (4π/10)μ_{0}H + μ_{0}M. Magnetic reluctance is given a hybrid unit to ensure the validity of Ohm's law for magnetic circuits.

In all the practical systems ε_{0} = 8.8542 × 10^{−14} A⋅s/(V⋅cm), μ_{0} = 1 V⋅s/(A⋅cm), and c^{2} = 1/(4π × 10^{−9} ε_{0}μ_{0}). Maxwell's equations in free space are also the same in all the systems.

Maxwell's equations in the practical systems
Name	All systems in vacuum	Gilbert systems in matter	Ampere-turn systems in matter
Gauss's law	$\nabla \cdot \mathbf{E} = \frac{1}{\varepsilon_0} \rho$	$\nabla \cdot \mathbf{D} = \rho$	$\nabla \cdot \mathbf{D} = \rho$
Gauss's law for magnetism	$\nabla \cdot \mathbf{B} = 0$	$\nabla \cdot \mathbf{B} = 0$	$\nabla \cdot \mathbf{B} = 0$
Faraday's law of induction	$\nabla \times \mathbf{E} + 10^{-8} \frac{\partial \mathbf{B}} {\partial t} = \mathbf{0}$	$\nabla \times \mathbf{E} + 10^{-8} \frac{\partial \mathbf{B}} {\partial t} = \mathbf{0}$	$\nabla \times \mathbf{E} + 10^{-8} \frac{\partial \mathbf{B}} {\partial t} = \mathbf{0}$
Ampère–Maxwell equation	$10^{-8}c^2 \nabla \times \mathbf{B} - \frac{\partial \mathbf{E}} {\partial t} = \frac{1}{\varepsilon_0} \mathbf{J}$	$\frac{10}{4\pi} \nabla \times \mathbf{H} - \frac{\partial \mathbf{D}} {\partial t} = \mathbf{J}$	$\nabla \times \mathbf{H} - \frac{\partial \mathbf{D}} {\partial t} = \mathbf{J}$

In the practical systems inductance is considered to be an electrical quantity and is defined by L = 10^{−8} NΦ_{B}/I. Its unit is the henry, symbolized by H. The mathematical unit of permeability is 1 H/cm, although the physical unit is 4π × 10^{−9} henry per centimetre. Here we use words for the physical unit and symbols for the mathematical unit, which is the symbol for the physical unit in the system.

=== Other variants ===
There were at various points in time about half a dozen systems of electromagnetic units in use, most based on the CGS system. These include the Gaussian units and the Heaviside–Lorentz units.

== Electromagnetic units in various CGS systems ==
Conversion of SI units in electromagnetism to ESU, EMU, and Gaussian subsystems of CGS
Quantity	Symbol	SI unit	ESU unit	Gaussian unit	EMU unit
electric charge	q	1 C	≘ 10^{−1} c statC (Fr)		≘ 10^{−1} abC
electric current	I	1 A	≘ 10^{−1} c statA (Fr/s)		≘ 10^{−1} abA (Bi)
electric potential / voltage	φ / V, E	1 V	≘ 10^{8} c^{−1} statV (erg/Fr)		≘ 10^{8} abV
electric field	E	1 V/m	≘ 10^{6} c^{−1} statV/cm (dyn/Fr)		≘ 10^{6} abV/cm
electric displacement field	D	1 C/m^{2}	≘ 4π × 10^{−5} c statC/cm^{2}		≘ 4π × 10^{−5} abC/cm^{2}
electric dipole moment	p	1 C⋅m	≘ 10 c statC⋅cm		≘ 10 abC⋅cm
electric flux (Note: The quantity here is the flux of the displacement field (D), not the electric field (E).)	Φ_{e}	1 C	≘ 4π × 10^{−1} c statC		≘ 4π × 10^{−1} abC
permittivity	ε	1 F/m	≘ 4π × 10^{−11} c^{2} cm/cm		≘ 4π × 10^{−11} s^{2}/cm^{2}
resistance	R	1 Ω	≘ 10^{9} c^{−2} statΩ (s/cm)		≘ 10^{9} abΩ
resistivity	ρ	1 Ω⋅m	≘ 10^{11} c^{−2} statΩ⋅cm (s)		≘ 10^{11} abΩ⋅cm
capacitance	C	1 F	≘ 10^{−9} c^{2} statF (cm)		≘ 10^{−9} abF
inductance	L	1 H	≘ 10^{9} c^{−2} statH (s^{2}/cm)		≘ 10^{9} abH
magnetic B field	B	1 T	≘ 10^{4} c^{−1} statT	≘ 10^{4} G	
magnetic H field	H	1 A/m	≘ 4π × 10^{−3} c statA/cm	≘ 4π × 10^{−3} Oe	
magnetic dipole moment	μ	1 A⋅m^{2}	≘ 10^{3} c statA⋅cm^{2}	≘ 10^{3} erg/G	
magnetic flux	Φ_{m}	1 Wb	≘ 10^{8} c^{−1} statWb	≘ 10^{8} Mx	
permeability	μ	1 H/m	≘ (4π)^{−1} × 10^{7} c^{−2} s^{2}/cm^{2}	≘ (4π)^{−1} × 10^{7} cm/cm	
magnetomotive force	$\mathcal F$	1 A	≘ 4π × 10^{−1} c statA	≘ 4π × 10^{−1} Gi	
magnetic reluctance	$\mathcal R$	1 H^{−1}	≘ 4π × 10^{−9} c^{2} statH^{−1}	≘ 4π × 10^{−9} Gi/Mx	

In this table, c = 29979245800 is the numeric value of the speed of light in vacuum when expressed in units of centimetres per second. The correspondence symbol "≘" is used instead of the equality sign "=" as a reminder that the conversion statements in the table are not equations. For example, interpreted as equations, the electric charge and electric flux rows of the table contradict each other because of the presence of the factor 4π in the latter but not the former. (Conversions between SI and four-dimensional rationalised ESU and EMU can, however, be written as equations.)

Conversion factors for rationalised ESU, EMU, and Gaussian units may be obtained from the foregoing table by deleting the factors of 4π and 1/(4π). The rationalised unit is equal to the factor 4π or 1/(4π) times the unrationalised unit. Absent such a factor, the rationalised unit is equal to the unrationalised unit.

Deletion of the factors also results in conversion factors for unrationalised MKSA units. The SI unit is equal to the deleted factor times the unrationalised MKSA unit. Absent such a factor, the SI unit is equal to the unrationalised MKSA unit.

== Physical constants in CGS units ==
Commonly used physical constants in CGS units
Constant	Symbol	Value
atomic mass constant	m_{u}	1.660539069×10^{−24} g
Bohr magneton	μ_{B}	9.274010066×10^{−21} erg/G (EMU, Gaussian)
Bohr magneton	μ_{B}	2.780278273×10^{−10} statA⋅cm^{2} (ESU)
Bohr radius	a_{0}	5.291772105×10^{−9} cm
Boltzmann constant	k	1.380649×10^{−16} erg/K
electron mass	m_{e}	9.10938371×10^{−28} g
elementary charge	e	4.80320471×10^{−10} Fr (ESU, Gaussian)
elementary charge	e	1.602176634×10^{−20} abC (EMU)
fine-structure constant	α	0.007297352564
Newtonian constant of gravitation	G	6.6743×10^{−8} dyn⋅cm^{2}/g^{2}
Planck constant	h	6.62607015×10^{−27} erg⋅s
reduced Planck constant	ħ	1.054571817×10^{−27} erg⋅s
speed of light	c	2.99792458×10^{10} cm/s

== Advantages and disadvantages ==
Lack of unique unit names leads to potential confusion: "15 emu" may mean either 15 abvolts, or 15 emu units of electric dipole moment, or 15 emu units of magnetic susceptibility, sometimes (but not always) per gram, or per mole. With its system of uniquely named units, the SI removes any confusion in usage: 1 ampere is a fixed value of a specified quantity, and so are 1 henry, 1 ohm, and 1 volt.

In the CGS-Gaussian system, electric and magnetic fields have the same units, 4πε_{0} is replaced by 1, and the only dimensional constant appearing in the Maxwell equations is c, the speed of light. The Heaviside–Lorentz system has these properties as well (with ε_{0} equaling 1).

In SI, and other rationalised systems (for example, Heaviside–Lorentz), the units were chosen such that electromagnetic equations concerning charged spheres contain 4π, those concerning coils of current and straight wires contain 2π and those dealing with charged surfaces lack π entirely, which was the most convenient choice for applications in electrical engineering and relates directly to the geometric symmetry of the system being described by the equation.

Specialised unit systems are used to simplify formulas further than either SI or CGS do, by eliminating constants through a convention of normalising quantities with respect to some system of natural units. For example, in particle physics a system is in use where every quantity is expressed by only one unit of energy, the electronvolt, with lengths, times, and so on all converted into units of energy by inserting factors of speed of light c and the reduced Planck constant ħ. This unit system is convenient for calculations in particle physics, but is impractical in other contexts.

== See also ==
- Outline of metrology and measurement
- International System of Units
- International System of Electrical and Magnetic Units
- List of metric units
- List of scientific units named after people
- Metre–tonne–second system of units
- United States customary units
- Foot–pound–second system of units

== General literature ==
- Griffiths, David J. (1999). "Appendix C: Units". Introduction to Electrodynamics (3rd ed.). Prentice Hall. ISBN 0-13-805326-X.
- Jackson, John D. (1999). "Appendix on Units and Dimensions". Classical Electrodynamics (3rd ed.). Wiley. ISBN 0-471-30932-X.
- Kent, William (1900). "Electrical Engineering. Standards of Measurement page 1024". The Mechanical Engineer's Pocket-book (5th ed.). Wiley.
- Littlejohn, Robert (Fall 2017). "Gaussian, SI and Other Systems of Units in Electromagnetic Theory" (PDF). Physics 221A, University of California, Berkeley, lecture notes. Archived (PDF) from the original on 2015-12-11.
