= HLU =

HLU may refer to:

- Heaviside–Lorentz units
- Helensburgh Upper railway station, in Scotland
- Hieroglyphic Luwian, an extinct Anatolian language
