= Vacuum permittivity =

Absolute dielectric permittivity of free space

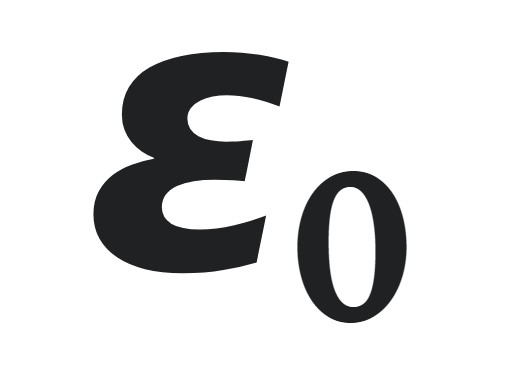
ε_{0}, the constant for vacuum permittivity

Value of ε_{0}	Unit
8.8541878188(14)×10^{−12}	F⋅m^{−1}
8.8541878188(14)×10^{−12}	C^{2}⋅s^{2}⋅kg^{−1}⋅m^{−3}
55.26349406	e^{2}⋅eV^{−1}⋅μm^{−1}

Vacuum permittivity, commonly denoted ε_{0} (pronounced "epsilon nought" or "epsilon zero"), is the value of the absolute dielectric permittivity of classical vacuum. It may also be referred to as the permittivity of free space, the electric constant, or the distributed capacitance of the vacuum. It is an ideal (baseline) physical constant. Its CODATA value is:

ε_{0} = 8.8541878188(14)×10^{−12} F⋅m^{−1}.

It is a measure of how dense of an electric field is "permitted" to form in response to electric charges and relates the units for electric charge to mechanical quantities such as length and force. For example, the force between two separated electric charges with spherical symmetry (in the vacuum of classical electromagnetism) is given by Coulomb's law:
$$F_\text{C} = \frac{1} {4 \pi \varepsilon_0} \frac{q_1 q_2} {r^2}$$

Here, q_{1} and q_{2} are the charges, r is the distance between their centres, and the value of the constant fraction 1/(4πε_{0}) is approximately 9×10^{9} N⋅m^{2}⋅C^{−2}. Likewise, ε_{0} appears in Maxwell's equations, which describe the properties of electric and magnetic fields and electromagnetic radiation, and relate them to their sources. In electrical engineering, ε_{0} itself is used as a unit to quantify the permittivity of various dielectric materials.

== Value ==
The value of ε_{0} obeys the relationship
$$\varepsilon_0 = \frac {1}{\mu_0 c^2}$$
where c is the defined value for the speed of light in classical vacuum in SI units, and μ_{0} is the parameter referred to as the magnetic constant (also called vacuum permeability or the permeability of free space).

== Terminology ==
Historically, the parameter ε_{0} has been known by many different names. The terms "vacuum permittivity" or its variants, such as "permittivity in/of vacuum", "permittivity of empty space", or "permittivity of free space" are widespread. Standards organizations also use "electric constant" as a term for this quantity.

Another historical synonym was "dielectric constant of vacuum", as "dielectric constant" was sometimes used in the past for the absolute permittivity. However, in modern usage "dielectric constant" typically refers exclusively to a relative permittivity ε/ε_{0} and even this usage is considered "obsolete" by some standards bodies in favor of relative static permittivity. Hence, the term "dielectric constant of vacuum" for the electric constant ε_{0} is considered obsolete by most modern authors, although occasional examples of continuing usage can be found.

As for notation, the constant can be denoted by either ε_{0} or ϵ_{0}, using either of the common glyphs for the letter epsilon.

== History ==
=== Rationalization of units ===
The experiments of Coulomb and others showed that the force F between two, equal, point-like "amounts" of electricity that are situated a distance r apart in free space, should be given by a formula that has the form
$$F = k_{\text{e}} \frac{Q^2}{r^2},$$
where Q is a quantity that represents the amount of electricity present at each of the two points, and k_{e} depends on the units. If one is starting with no constraints, then the value of k_{e} may be chosen arbitrarily. For each different choice of k_{e} there is a different "interpretation" of Q: to avoid confusion, each different "interpretation" has to be allocated a distinctive name and symbol.

In one of the systems of equations and units agreed in the late 19th century, called the "centimetre–gram–second electrostatic system of units" (the cgs esu system), the constant k_{e} was taken equal to 1, and a quantity now called "Gaussian electric charge" q_{s} was defined by the resulting equation
$$F = \frac{{q_{\text{s}}}^2}{r^2}.$$

The unit of Gaussian charge, the statcoulomb, is such that two units, at a distance of 1 centimetre apart, repel each other with a force equal to the cgs unit of force, the dyne. Thus, the unit of Gaussian charge can also be written 1 dyne^{1/2}⋅cm. "Gaussian electric charge" is not the same mathematical quantity as modern (MKS and subsequently the SI) electric charge and is not measured in coulombs.

The idea subsequently developed that it would be better, in situations of spherical geometry, to include a factor 4π in equations like Coulomb's law, and write it in the form:
$$F = k'_{\text{e}} \frac{{q'_{\text{s}}}^2}{4 \pi r^2}.$$

This idea is called "rationalization". The quantities q_{s}′ and k_{e}′ are not the same as those in the older convention. Putting k_{e}′ = 1 generates a unit of electricity of different size, but it still has the same dimensions as the cgs esu system.

The next step was to treat the quantity representing "amount of electricity" as a fundamental quantity in its own right, denoted by the symbol q, and to write Coulomb's law in its modern form:
$$\ F = \frac{1}{4 \pi \varepsilon_0} \frac{q^2}{r^2}.$$

The system of equations thus generated is known as the rationalized metre–kilogram–second (RMKS) equation system, or "metre–kilogram–second–ampere (MKSA)" equation system. The new quantity q is given the name "RMKS electric charge", or (nowadays) just "electric charge". The quantity q_{s} used in the old cgs esu system is related to the new quantity q by:
$$\ q_{\text{s}} = \frac{q}{\sqrt{4 \pi \varepsilon_0}}.$$

Prior to the 2019 revision of the SI, μ_{0} had an exact defined value of 4π × 10^{−7} H/m (by the former definition of the ampere), and c had (and retains) the defined value 299792458 m/s. Under that former definition, ε_{0} could be expressed numerically as an exact derivative:
$$\varepsilon_0 = \frac{1}{\left(4 \pi \times {10}^{-7} \, \mathrm{N/A^2}\right) {\left(299\,792\,458 \, \mathrm{m/s}\right)}^2} \approx {8.854\,187\,8176} \times {10}^{-12} \, \mathrm{F/m}.$$

=== Revision of the SI ===
The elementary charge was redefined exactly in terms of the coulomb as from 20 May 2019, with the effect that the vacuum electric permittivity and the magnetic vacuum permeability no longer have exact values in SI units. The value of the electron charge became a numerically defined quantity, making ε_{0} and μ_{0} measured quantities, neither of them exact, but related by the equation ε_{0}μ_{0}c^{2} = 1. These values are determined by the experimentally determined fine-structure constant α:
$$\varepsilon_0 = \frac {1}{\mu_0 c^2} = \frac {e^2}{2\alpha h c}\ ,$$
with e being the elementary charge, h being the Planck constant, and c being the speed of light in vacuum, each with exactly defined values. The relative uncertainty in the values of each of ε_{0} and μ_{0} are therefore the same as that for the fine-structure constant, namely 1.6×10^{−10}.

In the 2019 revision of the SI, the elementary charge is fixed at 1.602176634×10^{−19} C and the value of the vacuum permittivity must be determined experimentally.

=== Determination of a value for ε_{0} ===
One now adds the requirement that one wants force to be measured in newtons, distance in metres, and charge to be measured in the engineers' practical unit, the coulomb, which is defined as the charge accumulated when a current of 1 ampere flows for one second. This shows that the parameter ε_{0} should be allocated the unit C^{2}⋅N^{−1}⋅m^{−2} (or an equivalent unit – in practice, farad per metre).

In order to establish the numerical value of ε_{0}, one makes use of the fact that if one uses the rationalized forms of Coulomb's law and Ampère's force law (and other ideas) to develop Maxwell's equations, then the relationship stated above is found to exist between ε_{0}, μ_{0} and c. In principle, one has a choice of deciding whether to make the coulomb or the ampere the fundamental unit of electricity and magnetism. The decision was taken internationally to use the ampere. This means that the value of ε_{0} is determined by the values of c and μ_{0}, as stated above. For a brief explanation of how the value of μ_{0} is decided, see Vacuum permeability.

== Permittivity of real media ==
By convention, the electric constant ε_{0} appears in the relationship that defines the electric displacement field D in terms of the electric field E and classical electrical polarization density P of the medium. In general, this relationship has the form:
$$\mathbf{D} = \varepsilon_0 \mathbf{E} + \mathbf{P}.$$

For a linear dielectric, P is assumed to be proportional to E, but a delayed response is permitted and a spatially non-local response, so one has:
$$\mathbf D (\mathbf r,\ t) = \int_{-\infty}^t dt' \int d^3 \mathbf r'\, \varepsilon{\left(\mathbf r,\ t; \mathbf r',\ t'\right)} \, \mathbf E{\left(\mathbf r',\ t'\right)}.$$

In the event that nonlocality and delay of response are not important, the result is:
$$\mathbf{D} = \varepsilon \mathbf{E} = \varepsilon_{\text{r}} \varepsilon_0 \mathbf{E}$$
where ε is the permittivity and ε_{r} the relative static permittivity. In the vacuum of classical electromagnetism, the polarization P = 0, so ε_{r} = 1 and ε = ε_{0}.

== See also ==
- Casimir effect
- Coulomb's law
- Electromagnetic wave equation
- ISO 31-5
- Mathematical descriptions of the electromagnetic field
- Relative permittivity
- Sinusoidal plane-wave solutions of the electromagnetic wave equation
- Wave impedance
- Vacuum permeability
