= Farad =

SI unit of electric capacitance

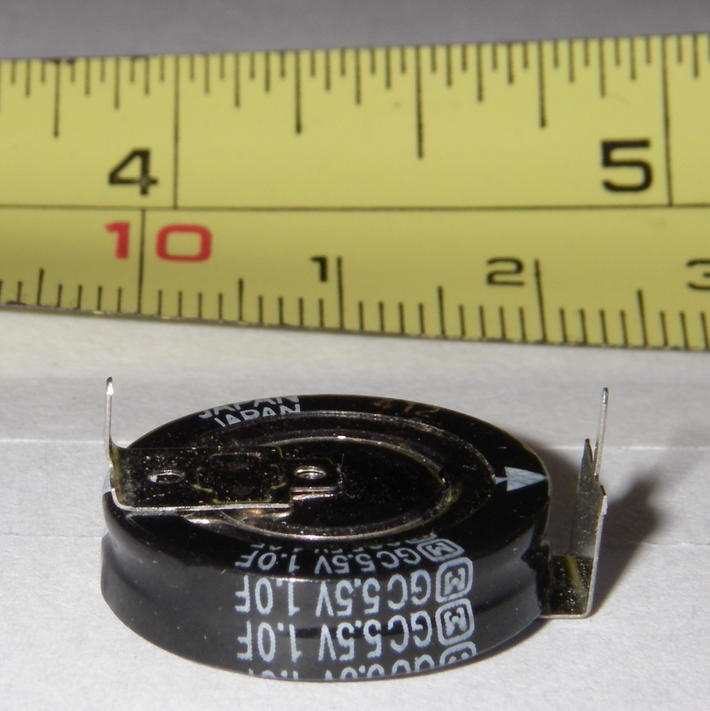
- A 1-farad supercapacitor. The scale behind is in inches (top) and centimetres (bottom).

General information
- Unit system: SI
- Unit of: capacitance
- Symbol: F
- Named after: Michael Faraday

Conversions
| 1 F in ... | ... is equal to ... |
- SI base units: kg^{−1}⋅m^{−2}⋅s^{4}⋅A^{2}

The farad (symbol: F) is the unit of electrical capacitance, the ability of a body to store an electrical charge, in the International System of Units (SI), equivalent to 1 coulomb per volt (C/V). It is named after the English physicist Michael Faraday (1791–1867). In SI base units 1 F = 1 kg^{−1}⋅m^{−2}⋅s^{4}⋅A^{2}.

== Definition ==
The capacitance of a capacitor is one farad when one coulomb of charge changes the potential between the plates by one volt. Equally, one farad can be described as the capacitance which stores a one-coulomb charge across a potential difference of one volt.

The relationship between capacitance, charge, and potential difference is linear. For example, if the potential difference across a capacitor is halved, the quantity of charge stored by that capacitor will also be halved.

For most applications, the farad is an impractically large unit of capacitance. Most electrical and electronic applications are covered by the following SI prefixes:

- 1 mF (millifarad, one thousandth (10^{−3}) of a farad) = 0.001 F = 1000 μF = 1000000000 pF
- 1 μF (microfarad, one millionth (10^{−6}) of a farad) = 0.000 001 F = 1000 nF = 1000000 pF
- 1 nF (nanofarad, one billionth (10^{−9}) of a farad) = 0.000 000 001 F = 0.001 μF = 1000 pF
- 1 pF (picofarad, one trillionth (10^{−12}) of a farad) = 0.000 000 000 001 F = 0.001 nF

=== Equalities ===
A farad is a derived unit based on four of the seven base units of the International System of Units: kilogram (kg), metre (m), second (s), and ampere (A).

Expressed in combinations of SI units, the farad is:
$$\text{F}
= \dfrac{\text{s}^4 {\cdot} \text{A}^2}{\text{m}^{2} {\cdot} \text{kg}}
= \dfrac{\text{s}^2 {\cdot} \text{C}^2}{\text{m}^{2} {\cdot} \text{kg}}
= \dfrac{\text{C}}{\text{V}}
= \dfrac{\text{A} {\cdot} \text{s}}{\text{V}}
= \dfrac{\text{W} {\cdot} \text{s}} {{\text{V}^2} }
= \dfrac{\text{J}}{{\text{V}^2} }
= \dfrac{\text{N} {\cdot} \text{m}} {{\text{V}^2} }
= \dfrac{\text{C}^2}{\text{J}}
= \dfrac{\text{C}^2}{\text{N} {\cdot} \text{m}}
= \dfrac{\text{s}}{\Omega}
= \dfrac{1}{\Omega {\cdot} \text{Hz}}
= \dfrac{\text{S}}{\text{Hz}}
= \dfrac{\text{s}^{2}}{\text{H}},$$

where F = farad, s = second, C = coulomb, V = volt, W = watt, J = joule, N = newton, Ω = ohm, Hz = hertz, S = siemens, H = henry, A = ampere.

== History ==
The term "farad" was originally coined by Latimer Clark and Charles Bright in 1861, in honor of Michael Faraday, for a unit of quantity of charge, and by 1873, the farad had become a unit of capacitance. In 1881, at the International Congress of Electricians in Paris, the name farad was officially used for the unit of electrical capacitance.

== Explanation ==
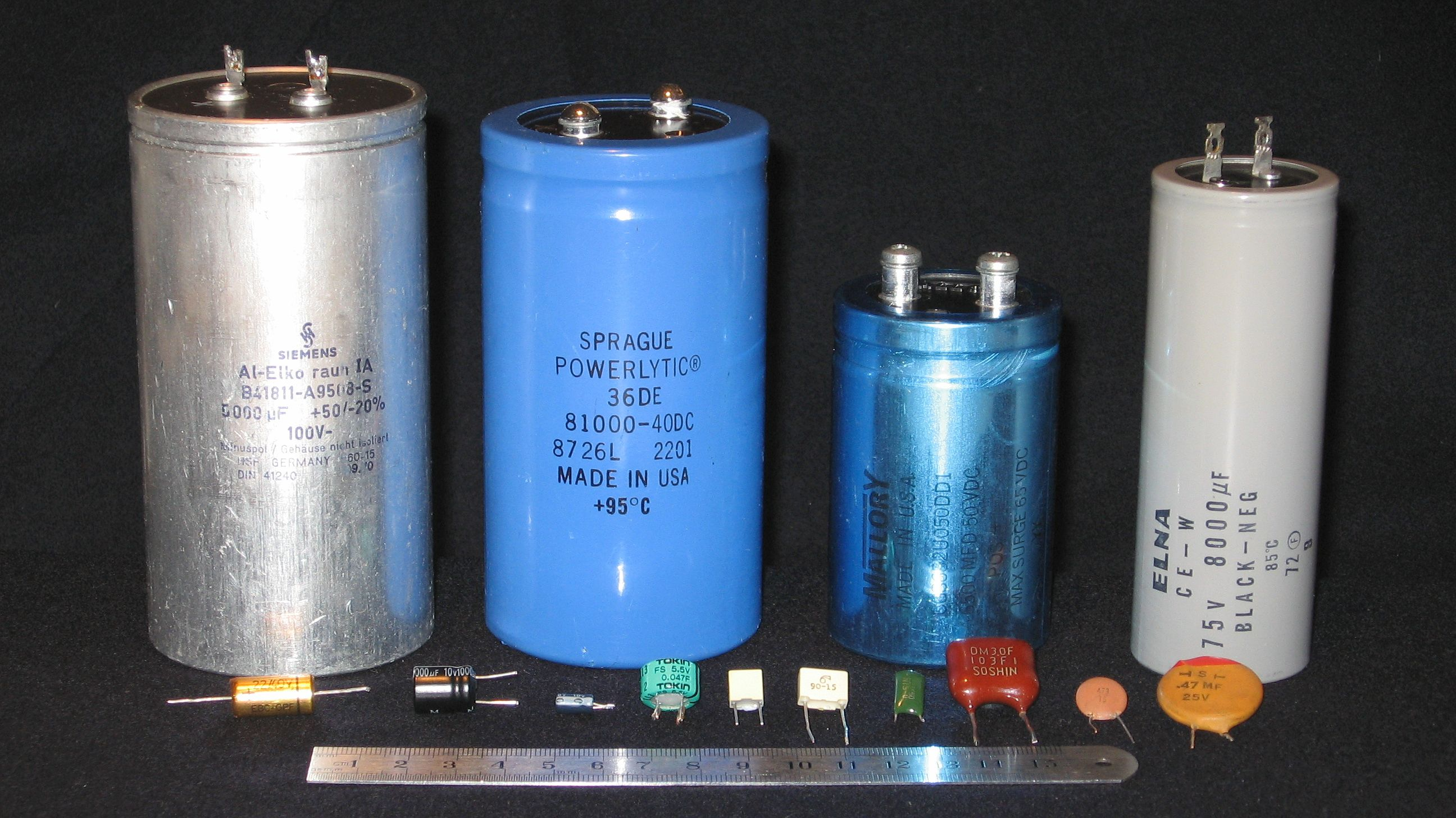
Examples of different types of capacitors

A capacitor generally consists of two conducting surfaces, frequently referred to as plates, separated by an insulating layer usually referred to as a dielectric. The original capacitor was the Leyden jar developed in the 18th century. It is the accumulation of electric charge on the plates that results in capacitance. Modern capacitors are constructed using a range of manufacturing techniques and materials to provide the extraordinarily wide range of capacitance values used in electronics applications from femtofarads to farads, with maximum-voltage ratings ranging from a few volts to several kilovolts.

Values of capacitors are usually specified in terms of SI prefixes of farads (F), microfarads (μF), nanofarads (nF) and picofarads (pF). The millifarad (mF) is rarely used in practice; a capacitance of 4.7 mF (0.0047 F), for example, is instead written as 4700 μF. The nanofarad (nF) is used more often in Europe than in the United States. The size of commercially available capacitors ranges from around 0.1 pF to 5000F (5 kF) supercapacitors. Parasitic capacitance in high-performance integrated circuits can be measured in femtofarads (1 fF = 0.001 pF = 10^{−15} F), while high-performance test equipment can detect changes in capacitance on the order of tens of attofarads (1 aF = 10^{−18} F).

A value of 0.1 pF is about the smallest available in capacitors for general use in electronic design, since smaller ones would be dominated by the parasitic capacitances of other components, wiring or printed circuit boards. Capacitance values of 1 pF or lower can be achieved by twisting two short lengths of insulated wire together.

The capacitance of the Earth's ionosphere with respect to the ground is calculated to be about 1 F.

=== Informal and deprecated terminology ===
The picofarad (pF) is sometimes colloquially pronounced as "puff" or "pic", as in "a ten-puff capacitor". Similarly, "mic" (pronounced "mike") is sometimes used informally to signify microfarads.

Nonstandard abbreviations were and are often used. Farad has been abbreviated "f", "fd", and "Fd". For the prefix "micro-", when the Greek small letter "μ" or the legacy micro sign "μ" is not available (as on typewriters) or inconvenient to enter, it is often substituted with the similar-appearing "u" or "U", with little risk of confusion. It was also substituted with the similar-sounding "M" or "m", which can be confusing because M officially stands for 1,000,000, and m preferably stands for 1/1000. In texts prior to 1960, and on capacitor packages until more recently, "microfarad(s)" was abbreviated "mf" or "MFD" rather than the modern "μF". A 1940 Radio Shack catalog listed every capacitor's rating in "Mfd.", from 0.000005 Mfd. (5 pF) to 50 Mfd. (50 μF).

"Micromicrofarad" or "micro-microfarad" is an obsolete unit found in some older texts and labels, contains a nonstandard metric double prefix. It is exactly equivalent to a picofarad (pF). It is abbreviated μμF, uuF, or (confusingly) "mmf", "MMF", or "MMFD".

Summary of obsolete or deprecated capacitance units or abbreviations: (upper/lower case variations are not shown)

- μF (microfarad) = mf, mfd, uf
- pF (picofarad) = mmf, mmfd, pfd, μμF

U+3332 ㌲ SQUARE HUARADDO is a square version of ファラッド (faraddo, the Japanese word for "farad") intended for Japanese vertical text. It is included in Unicode for compatibility with earlier character sets.

=== Related concepts ===
The reciprocal of capacitance is called electrical elastance, the (non-standard, non-SI) unit of which is the daraf.

== CGS units ==
The abfarad (abbreviated abF) is an obsolete CGS unit of capacitance, which corresponds to 10^{9} farads (1 gigafarad, GF).

The statfarad (abbreviated statF) is a rarely used CGS unit equivalent to the capacitance of a capacitor with a charge of 1 statcoulomb across a potential difference of 1 statvolt. It is 1/(10^{−5} c^{2}) farad, approximately 1.1126 picofarads. More commonly, the centimeter (cm) is used, which is equal to the statfarad.
