= Statvolt =

CGS-ESU and gaussian unit of voltage

statvolt
- Unit system: CGS-ESU and CGS-Gaussian
- Unit of: electric potential, electric potential difference (voltage), and electromotive force
- Symbol: statV
- Named after: Alessandro Volta
- In CGS base units: g^{1/2}·cm^{1/2}/s ^{:26}

Conversions
1 statV in ...	... corresponds to ...
- SI: c_{cgs} 10^{−8} volt = 299.792458 volt (Note: The dimensionless constant c_{cgs} = 2.99792458×10^{10} is numerically equal to the magnitude of the speed of light when the latter is expressed in cm/s.)
- CGS-EMU: c_{cgs} abvolt

The statvolt is a unit of voltage and electrical potential used in the CGS-ESU and gaussian systems of units. In terms of its relation to the SI units, one statvolt corresponds to c_{cgs} 10^{−8} volt, i.e. to 299.792458 volts. (Note: As of the 2019 revision of the SI, this correspondence is not longer exact.)

The statvolt is also defined in the CGS system as 1 erg per statcoulomb. It is a useful unit for electromagnetism because, in vacuum, an electric field of one statvolt per centimetre has the same energy density as a magnetic field of one gauss. Likewise, a plane wave propagating in vacuum has perpendicular electric and magnetic fields such that for every gauss of magnetic field intensity there is one statvolt/cm of electric field intensity.

In the CGS-EMU system, the unit of voltage is the abvolt.

== Additional Information ==
The statvolt is a fundamental unit of electric potential in the centimetre-gram-second electrostatic unit (CGS-ESU) and Gaussian unit systems. It is defined as the potential difference between two points that imparts one erg of energy per statcoulomb of charge. This unit's relevance stems from its convenient relationship to electromagnetic quantities in vacuum, where an electric field of one statvolt per centimetre corresponds energetically to a magnetic field of one gauss.

In practical terms, one statvolt is equivalent to approximately 299.792458 volts in the International System of Units (SI), which makes it significantly larger than the standard volt. This conversion factor arises from the speed of light, c, linking electromagnetic units in the CGS system to those in SI.

Unlike the statvolt, the CGS electromagnetic unit (CGS-EMU) system uses the abvolt as its voltage unit, which differs significantly in magnitude and definition.
