= Vacuum permeability =

Physical constant

vacuum magnetic permeability
- Other names: vacuum permeability, permeability of free space, permeability of vacuum, magnetic constant
- Common symbols: μ_{0}
- Dimension: $\mathsf{L} \mathsf{M} \mathsf{T}^{-2} \mathsf{I}^{-2}$
- Value: 1.25663706127(20)×10^{−6} N⋅A^{−2}

The vacuum magnetic permeability (variously vacuum permeability, permeability of free space, permeability of vacuum, magnetic constant) is the magnetic permeability in a classical vacuum. It is a physical constant, conventionally written as μ_{0} (pronounced "mu nought" or "mu zero"), approximately equal to 4π × 10^{−7} H/m (by the former definition of the ampere). It quantifies the strength of the magnetic field induced by an electric current. Expressed in terms of SI base units, it has the unit kg⋅m⋅s^{−2}⋅A^{−2}. It can be also expressed in terms of SI derived units, N⋅A^{−2}, H·m^{−1}, or T·m·A^{−1}, which are all equivalent.

Since the revision of the SI in 2019 (when the values of e and h were fixed as defined quantities), μ_{0} is an experimentally determined constant with its value proportional to the dimensionless fine-structure constant, which is known to a relative uncertainty of 1.6×10^{−10}, with no other dependencies with experimental uncertainty. Its value in SI units as recommended by CODATA is:

μ_{0} = 1.25663706127(20)×10^{−6} N⋅A^{−2}

This is equal to 4π × [1 − (1.3 ± 1.6) × 10^{−10}] × 10^{−7} N/A^{2}, with a relative deviation (of order 10^{−10}, i.e. less than a part per billion) from the former defined value that is within its uncertainty.

The terminology of permeability and susceptibility was introduced by William Thomson, 1st Baron Kelvin in 1872. The modern notation of permeability as μ and permittivity as ε has been in use since the 1950s.

== Ampere-defined vacuum permeability ==
Two thin, straight, stationary, parallel wires, a distance r apart in free space, each carrying a current I, will exert a force on each other. Ampère's force law states that the magnetic force F_{m} per length L is given by
$$\frac{|\mathbf F_\text{m}|}{L}={\mu_0\over2\pi}{I^2\over|\boldsymbol{r}|}.$$
From 1948 until 2019, the ampere was defined as "that constant current which, if maintained in two straight parallel conductors of infinite length, of negligible circular cross section, and placed 1 metre apart in vacuum, would produce between these conductors a force equal to 2×10^{−7} newton per metre of length". (Note: This choice defines the SI unit of current, the ampere: "Unit of electric current (ampere)". Historical context of the SI. NIST.) The current in this definition needed to be measured with a known weight and known separation of the wires, defined in terms of the international standards of mass, length, and time in order to produce a standard for the ampere (and this is what the Kibble balance was designed for). Applying Ampère's force law:
$$\frac{\mathbf{F}_\text{m}}{L} = {\mu_0 \over 2\pi} \mathrm{(1\, A)^2\over{1\, m}}$$
$${2\times 10^{-7}\ \mathrm{ N/m}} = {\mu_0 \over 2\pi}\mathrm{(1\, A)^2 \over{1\, m}}$$
$$\mu_0 = 4 \pi \times 10^{-7}\text{ N/A}^2$$
Thus, during that period, μ_{0} had a defined value when expressed in henries per metre (H/m, equivalent to N/A^{2}):

μ_{0} = 4π×10^{−7} H/m = 1.25663706143...×10^{−6} N/A^{2}

In the 2019 revision of the SI, the ampere is defined exactly in terms of the elementary charge and the second, and the value of μ_{0} is now determined experimentally (based on the measured value of the fine-structure constant), and the Kibble balance has become an instrument for measuring weight from a known current, rather than measuring current from a known weight.

The 2022 CODATA value for μ_{0} in the new system is 4π × 0.99999999987(16)×10^{−7} H/m. The relative deviation of the recommended measured value (1.3×10^{−10} or 0.13 parts per billion) from the former defined value is within its uncertainty (1.6×10^{−10}, in relative terms, or 0.16 parts per billion).

== Terminology ==
NIST/CODATA refers to μ_{0} as the vacuum magnetic permeability. Prior to the 2019 revision, it was referred to as the magnetic constant. Historically, the constant μ_{0} has had different names. In the 1987 IUPAP Red book, for example, this constant was called the permeability of vacuum. Another, now rather rare and obsolete, term is "magnetic permittivity of vacuum". See, for example, Servant et al. Variations thereof, such as "permeability of free space", remain widespread.

The name "magnetic constant" was briefly used by standards organizations in order to avoid use of the terms "permeability" and "vacuum", which have physical meanings. The change of name had been made because μ_{0} was a defined value, and was not the result of experimental measurement (see below). In the new SI system, the permeability of vacuum no longer has a defined value, but is a measured quantity, with an uncertainty related to that of the (measured) dimensionless fine structure constant.

== Systems of units and historical origin of value of μ_{0} ==
In principle, there are several equation systems that could be used to set up a system of electrical quantities and units. Since the late 19th century, the fundamental definitions of current units have been related to the definitions of mass, length, and time units, using Ampère's force law. However, the precise way in which this has "officially" been done has changed many times, as measurement techniques and thinking on the topic developed. The overall history of the unit of electric current, and of the related question of how to define a set of equations for describing electromagnetic phenomena, is very complicated. Briefly, the basic reason why μ_{0} has the value it does is as follows.

Ampère's force law describes the experimentally-derived fact that, for two thin, straight, stationary, parallel wires, a distance r apart, in each of which a current I flows, the force per unit length, F_{m}/L, that one wire exerts upon the other in the vacuum of free space would be given by
$$\frac{F_{\mathrm{m}}}{L} \propto \frac {I^2} {r}.$$
Writing the constant of proportionality as k_{m} gives
$$\frac{F_{\mathrm{m}}}{L} = k_{\mathrm{m}} \frac {I^2} {r}.$$
The form of k_{m} needs to be chosen in order to set up a system of equations, and a value then needs to be allocated in order to define the unit of current.

In the old "electromagnetic (emu)" system of units, defined in the late 19th century, k_{m} was chosen to be a pure number equal to 2, distance was measured in centimetres, force was measured in the cgs unit dyne, and the currents defined by this equation were measured in the "electromagnetic unit (emu) of current", the "abampere". A practical unit to be used by electricians and engineers, the ampere, was then defined as equal to one tenth of the electromagnetic unit of current.

In another system, the "rationalized metre–kilogram–second (rmks) system" (or alternatively the "metre–kilogram–second–ampere (mksa) system"), k_{m} is written as μ_{0}/2π, where μ_{0} is a measurement-system constant called the "magnetic constant". (Note: The decision to explicitly include the factor of 2π in k_{m} stems from the "rationalization" of the equations used to describe physical electromagnetic phenomena.) The value of μ_{0} was chosen such that the rmks unit of current is equal in size to the ampere in the emu system: μ_{0} was defined to be 4π × 10^{−7} H/m.

Historically, several different systems (including the two described above) were in use simultaneously. In particular, physicists and engineers used different systems, and physicists used three different systems for different parts of physics theory and a fourth different system (the engineers' system) for laboratory experiments. In 1948, international decisions were made by standards organizations to adopt the rmks system, and its related set of electrical quantities and units, as the single main international system for describing electromagnetic phenomena in the International System of Units.

== Significance in electromagnetism ==
The magnetic constant μ_{0} appears in Maxwell's equations, which describe the properties of electric and magnetic fields and electromagnetic radiation, and relate them to their sources. In particular, it appears in relationship to quantities such as permeability and magnetization density, such as the relationship that defines the magnetic H-field in terms of the magnetic B-field. In real media, this relationship has the form:
$$\mathbf H={\mathbf B\over\mu_0}-\mathbf M,$$
where M is the magnetization density. In vacuum, M = 0.

In the International System of Quantities (ISQ), the speed of light in vacuum, c, is related to the magnetic constant and the electric constant (vacuum permittivity), ε_{0}, by the equation:
$$c^2={1\over{\mu_0\varepsilon_0}}.$$
This relation can be derived using Maxwell's equations of classical electromagnetism in the medium of classical vacuum. Between 1948 and 2018, this relation was used by BIPM (International Bureau of Weights and Measures) and NIST (National Institute of Standards and Technology) as a definition of ε_{0} in terms of the defined numerical value for c and, prior to 2018, the defined numerical value for μ_{0}. During this period of standards definitions, it was not presented as a derived result contingent upon the validity of Maxwell's equations.

Conversely, as the permittivity is related to the fine-structure constant (α), the permeability can be derived from the latter (using the Planck constant, h, and the elementary charge, e):
$$\mu_0 = \frac{2 \alpha h}{e^2 c} = 4\pi \times \frac{\alpha \hbar}{e^2c}.$$

In the new SI units, only the fine structure constant is a measured value in SI units in the expression on the right, since the remaining constants have defined values in SI units.

== See also ==
- Impedance of free space
- Electromagnetic wave equation
- Mathematical descriptions of the electromagnetic field
- 2019 revision of the SI
- Sinusoidal plane-wave solutions of the electromagnetic wave equation
- Vacuum permittivity
