= Gilbert (unit) =

The gilbert (symbol: Gb) is a unit used in practical cgs and CGS-EMU systems to measure magnetomotive force. The unit is named for English physicist William Gilbert.

Definition:

- 1 Gb = (1/4π) Bi-t

Conversion to the corresponding quantity in the SI, with the unit ampere-turn (A⋅t):

- 1 Gb ≘ (10/4π) A-turn ≈ 0.7957747 A⋅t
- 1 A-turn ≘ 4π × 10^{−1} Gb
