= Statcoulomb =

CGS unit of electric charge

statcoulomb
- Unit system: Gaussian, CGS-ESU
- Unit of: electric charge
- Symbol: Fr, statC, esu
- Derivation: dyn^{1/2}⋅cm

Conversions
1 Fr in ...	... is equal to ...
- CGS base units: 1 cm^{3/2}⋅g^{1/2}⋅s^{−1}
- SI (charge): ≘ ~ 3.33564×10^{−10} C
- SI (flux): ≘ ~ 2.65×10^{−11} C

The statcoulomb (statC), franklin (Fr), or electrostatic unit of charge (esu) is the unit of measurement for electrical charge used in the centimetre–gram–second electrostatic units variant (CGS-ESU) and Gaussian systems of units. In terms of the Gaussian base units, it is

1 statC = 1 dyn^{1/2}⋅cm = 1 cm^{3/2}⋅g^{1/2}⋅s^{−1}.

That is, it is defined so that the proportionality constant in Coulomb's law using CGS-ESU quantities is a dimensionless quantity equal to 1.

== Definition and relation to CGS base units ==
Coulomb's law in the CGS-Gaussian system takes the form
$$F = \frac{q_1^{_\text{G}} q_2^{_\text{G}}}{r^2} ,$$
where F is the force, q^{G}_{1} and q^{G}_{2} are the two electric charges, and r is the distance between the charges. This serves to define charge as a quantity in the Gaussian system.

The statcoulomb is defined such that if two electric charges of 1 statC each and have a separation of 1 cm, the force of mutual electrical repulsion is 1 dyne. Substituting F = 1 dyn, q^{G}_{1} = q^{G}_{2} = 1 statC, and r = 1 cm, we get:

1 statC = g^{1/2}⋅cm^{3/2}⋅s^{−1}.

From this it is also evident that the quantity dimension of electric charge as defined in the CGS-ESU and Gaussian systems is M^{1/2}L^{3/2}T^{−1}.

== Conversion between systems ==
Conversion of a quantity to the corresponding quantity of the International System of Quantities (ISQ) that underlies the International System of Units (SI) by using the defining equations of each system.

The SI uses the coulomb (C) as its unit of electric charge. The conversion factor between corresponding quantities with the units coulomb and statcoulomb depends on which quantity is to be converted. The most common cases are:

- For electric charge:
  1 C ≘ 1 C × √1/4πε_{0} ≈ 2.99792×10^{9} statC
  1 statC ≘ 1 statC × √4πε_{0} ≈ 3.33564×10^{−10} C.
- For electric flux (Φ_{D}):
  1 C ≘ 1 C × √4π/ε_{0} ≈ 3.76730×10^{10} statC
  1 statC ≘ 1 statC × √ε_{0}/4π ≈ 2.65442×10^{−11} C.
- For electric flux density (D):
  1 C/m^{2} ≘ 1 C/m^{2} × √4π/ε_{0} ≈ 3.76730×10^{6} statC/cm^{2}
  1 statC/cm^{2} ≘ 1 statC/cm^{2} × √ε_{0}/4π ≈ 2.65442×10^{−7} C/m^{2}.

The symbol "≘" ('corresponds to') is used instead of "=" because the two sides cannot be equated.
