= List of conversion factors =

This article gives a list of conversion factors for several physical quantities. A number of different units (some only of historical interest) are shown and expressed in terms of the corresponding SI unit. Conversions between units in the metric system are defined by their prefixes (for example, 1 kilogram = 1000 grams, 1 milligram = 0.001 grams) and are thus not listed in this article. Exceptions are made if the unit is commonly known by another name (for example, 1 micron = 10^{−6} metre). Within each table, the units are listed alphabetically, and the SI units (base or derived) are highlighted.

The following quantities are considered: length, area, volume, plane angle, solid angle, mass, density, time, frequency, velocity, volumetric flow rate, acceleration, force, pressure (or mechanical stress), torque (or moment of force), energy, power (or heat flow rate), action, dynamic viscosity, kinematic viscosity, electric current, electric charge, electric dipole, electromotive force (or electric potential difference), electrical resistance, capacitance, magnetic flux, magnetic flux density, inductance, temperature, information entropy, luminous intensity, luminance, luminous flux, illuminance, radiation.

Legend
Symbol	Definition
≡	exactly equal
≈	approximately equal to
≘	(exactly) corresponds to (different types of quantity describing the same phenomenon)
d̅i̅g̅i̅t̅s̅	indicates that digits repeat infinitely (e.g. 8.2943̅6̅9̅ corresponds to 8.294369369369369...)
(H)	of chiefly historical interest

== Length ==
Length
Name of unit	Symbol	Definition	Relation to SI units
ångström	Å	≡ 1×10^{−10} m	≡ 0.1 nm
astronomical unit	au	≡ 149597870700 m ≈ Distance from Earth to Sun	≡ 149597870700 m
attometre	am	≡ 1×10^{−18} m	≡ 1×10^{−18} m
barleycorn (H)		= 1/3 in (see note above about rounding)	= 8.46̅×10^{−3} m
bohr, atomic unit of length	a_{0}	= Bohr radius of hydrogen	≈ 5.2917721092(17)×10^{−11} m
cable length (imperial)		≡ 608 ft	≈ 185.3184 m
cable length (International)		≡ 1/10 nmi	≡ 185.2 m
cable length (US)		≡ 720 ft	= 219.456 m
chain (Gunter's; Surveyor's)	ch	≡ 66 ft (US) ≡ 4 rods	≈ 20.11684 m
cubit (H)		≡ Distance from fingers to elbow ≈ 18 in	≈ 0.5 m
ell (H)	ell	≡ 45 in (In England usually)	= 1.143 m
fathom	ftm	≡ 6 ft	= 1.8288 m
femtometre	fm	≡ 1×10^{−15} m	≡ 1×10^{−15} m
fermi	fm	≡ 1×10^{−15} m	≡ 1×10^{−15} m
finger		≡ 7/8 in	= 0.022225 m
finger (cloth)		≡ 4 1/2 in	= 0.1143 m
foot (Benoît) (H)	ft (Ben)		≈ 0.304799735 m
foot (Cape) (H)		Legally defined as 1.033 English feet in 1859	≈ 0.314858 m
foot (Clarke's) (H)	ft (Cla)		≈ 0.3047972654 m
foot (Indian) (H)	ft Ind		≈ 0.304799514 m
foot, metric	mf	≡ 300 mm	≡ 0.3 m
foot, metric (Mesures usuelles) (H)		≡ 1/3 m	≡ 0.3̅ m
foot (International)	ft	≡ 0.3048 m ≡ 1/3 yd ≡ 12 inches	≡ 0.3048 m
foot (Sear's) (H)	ft (Sear)		≈ 0.30479947 m
foot (US Survey)	ft (US)	≡ 1200/3937 m	≈ 0.304800610 m
french; charriere	F	≡ 1/3 mm	= 0.3̅×10^{−3} m
furlong	fur	≡ 10 chains = 660 ft = 220 yd	= 201.168 m
hand		≡ 4 in	≡ 0.1016 m
inch (International)	in	≡ 2.54 cm ≡ 1/36 yd ≡ 1/12 ft	≡ 0.0254 m
league (land)	lea	≈ 1 hour walk, Currently defined in US as 3 Statute miles, but historically varied from 2 to 9 km	≈ 4828 m
light-day		≡ 24 light-hours	≡ 2.59020683712×10^{13} m
light-hour		≡ 60 light-minutes	≡ 1.0792528488×10^{12} m
light-minute		≡ 60 light-seconds	≡ 1.798754748×10^{10} m
light-second		≡ Distance light travels in one second in vacuum	≡ 299792458 m
light-year	ly	≡ Distance light travels in vacuum in 365.25 days	≡ 9.4607304725808×10^{15} m
line	ln	≡ 1/12 in	= 0.002116̅ m
link (Gunter's; Surveyor's)	lnk	≡ 1/100 ch ≡ 0.66 ft (US) ≡ 7.92 in	≈ 0.2011684 m
link (Ramsden's; Engineer's)	lnk	≡ 1 ft	= 0.3048 m
metre (SI base unit) (meter)	m	≡ Distance light travels in 1/299792458 of a second in vacuum.	(SI base unit)
mickey		≡ 1/200 in	= 1.27×10^{−4} m
micrometre (old: micron)	μ; μm	≡ 1×10^{−6} m	≡ 1×10^{−6} m
mil; thou	mil	≡ 1×10^{−3} in	= 2.54×10^{−5} m
mil (Sweden and Norway)	mil	≡ 10 km	= 10000 m
mile (geographical) (H)		≡ 6082 ft	= 1853.7936 m
mile (international)	mi	≡ 80 chains ≡ 5280 ft ≡ 1760 yd	≡ 1609.344 m
mile (tactical or data)		≡ 6000 ft	≡ 1828.8 m
mile (telegraph) (H)	mi	≡ 6087 ft	= 1855.3176 m
mile (US Survey)	mi	≡ 5280 US Survey feet ≡ (5280 × 1200/3937) m	≈ 1609.347219 m
nail (cloth)		≡ 2 1/4 in	= 0.05715 m
nanometre	nm	≡ 1×10^{−9} m	≡ 1×10^{−9} m
nautical league	NL; nl	≡ 3 nmi	= 5556 m
nautical mile (Admiralty)	NM (Adm); nmi (Adm)	= 6080 ft	= 1853.184 m
nautical mile (international)	NM; nmi	≡ 1852 m	≡ 1852 m
nautical mile (US pre 1954)		≡ 1853.248 m	≡ 1853.248 m
pace		≡ 2.5 ft	= 0.762 m
palm		≡ 3 in	= 0.0762 m
parsec	pc	Distant point with a parallax shift of one arc second from a base of one astronomical unit. ≡ 648000/π au	≈ 30856775814913700 m
pica		≡ 12 points	Dependent on point measures.
picometre	pm	≡ 1×10^{−12} m	≡ 1×10^{−12} m
point (American, English)	pt	≡ 1/72.272 in	≈ 0.000351450 m
point (Didot; European)	pt	≡ 1/12 × 1/72 of pied du roi; After 1878: ≡ 5/133 cm	≈ 0.00037597 m; After 1878: ≈ 0.00037593985 m
point (PostScript)	pt	≡ 1/72 in	= 0.0003527̅ m
point (TeX)	pt	≡ 1/72.27 in	= 0.000̅3̅5̅1̅4̅5̅9̅8̅ m
quarter		≡ 1/4 yd	= 0.2286 m
rod; pole; perch (H)	rd	≡ 16 1/2 ft	= 5.0292 m
rope (H)	rope	≡ 20 ft	= 6.096 m
shaku (Japan)		≡ 10/33 m	≈ 0.303 0303 m
span (H)		≡ 9 in	= 0.2286 m
spat			≡ 1×10^{12} m
stick (H)		≡ 2 in	= 0.0508 m
soot		≡ 1/8 in	= 0.0031 m
toise (French, post 1667) (H)	T	≡ 27000/13853 m	≈ 1.949 0363 m
twip	twp	≡ 1/1440 in	= 1.7638̅×10^{−5} m
x unit; siegbahn	xu		≈ 1.0021×10^{−13} m
yard (International)	yd	≡ 0.9144 m ≡ 3 ft ≡ 36 in	≡ 0.9144 m
yoctometre	ym	≡ 1×10^{−24} m	≡ 1×10^{−24} m
zeptometre	zm	≡ 1×10^{−21} m	≡ 1×10^{−21} m

== Area ==
Area
Name of unit	Symbol	Definition	Relation to SI units
acre (international)	ac	≡ 1 ch × 10 ch = 4840 sq yd	≡ 4046.8564224 m^{2}
acre (US survey)	ac	≡ 10 sq ch = 4840 sq yd, also 43560 sq ft	≈ 4046.873 m^{2}
are	a	≡ 100 m^{2}	≡ 100 m^{2}
barn	b	≡ 10^{−28} m^{2}	≡ 10^{−28} m^{2}
barony		≡ 4000 ac	≡ 1.61874256896×10^{7} m^{2}
board	bd	≡ 1 in × 1 ft	≡ 7.74192×10^{−3} m^{2}
boiler horsepower equivalent direct radiation	bhp EDR	≡ 1 ft^{2} × 1 bhp / (240 BTU_{IT}/h)	≈ 12.958174 m^{2}
circular inch	circ in	≡ π/4 sq in	≈ 5.067075×10^{−4} m^{2}
circular mil; circular thou	circ mil	≡ π/4 mil^{2}	≈ 5.067075×10^{−10} m^{2}
cord		≡ 192 bd	≡ 1.48644864 m^{2}
cuerda (PR Survey)	cda	≡ 1 cda x 1 cda = 0.971222 acre	≡ 3930.395625 m^{2}
dunam		≡ 1000 m^{2}	≡ 1000 m^{2}
guntha (India)		≡ 121 sq yd	≈ 101.17 m^{2}
hectare	ha	≡ 10000 m^{2}	≡ 10000 m^{2}
hide		≈ 120 ac (variable)	≈ 5×10^{5} m^{2}
rood	ro	≡ 1/4 ac	= 1011.7141056 m^{2}
ping		≡ 20/11 m × 20/11 m	≈ 3.306 m^{2}
section		≡ 1 mi × 1 mi	= 2.589988110336×10^{6} m^{2}
shed		≡ 10^{−52} m^{2}	= 10^{−52} m^{2}
square (roofing)		≡ 10 ft × 10 ft	= 9.290304 m^{2}
square chain (international)	sq ch	≡ 66 ft × 66 ft = 1/10 ac	≡ 404.68564224 m^{2}
square chain (US Survey)	sq ch	≡ 66 ft (US) × 66 ft (US) = 1/10 US survey acre	≈ 404.6873 m^{2}
square foot	sq ft	≡ 1 ft × 1 ft	≡ 9.290304×10^{−2} m^{2}
square foot (US Survey)	sq ft	≡ 1 ft (US) × 1 ft (US)	≈ 9.2903411613275×10^{−2} m^{2}
square inch	sq in	≡ 1 in × 1 in	≡ 6.4516×10^{−4} m^{2}
square kilometre	km^{2}	≡ 1 km × 1 km	= 10^{6} m^{2}
square link (Gunter's)(International)	sq lnk	≡ 1 lnk × 1 lnk ≡ 0.66 ft × 0.66 ft	= 4.0468564224×10^{−2} m^{2}
square link (Gunter's)(US Survey)	sq lnk	≡ 1 lnk × 1 lnk ≡ 0.66 ft (US) × 0.66 ft (US)	≈ 4.046872×10^{−2} m^{2}
square link (Ramsden's)	sq lnk	≡ 1 lnk × 1 lnk ≡ 1 ft × 1 ft	= 0.09290304 m^{2}
square metre (SI unit)	m^{2}	≡ 1 m × 1 m	= 1 m^{2}
square mil; square thou	sq mil	≡ 1 mil × 1 mil	= 6.4516×10^{−10} m^{2}
square mile	sq mi	≡ 1 mi × 1 mi	≡ 2.589988110336×10^{6} m^{2}
square mile (US Survey)	sq mi	≡ 1 mi (US) × 1 mi (US)	≈ 2.58999847×10^{6} m^{2}
square rod/pole/perch	sq rd	≡ 1 rd × 1 rd	= 25.29285264 m^{2}
square yard (International)	sq yd	≡ 1 yd × 1 yd	≡ 0.83612736 m^{2}
stremma		≡ 1000 m^{2}	= 1000 m^{2}
township		≡ 36 sq mi (US)	≈ 9.323994×10^{7} m^{2}
yardland		≈ 30 ac	≈ 1.2×10^{5} m^{2}

== Volume ==
Volume
Name of unit	Symbol	Definition	Relation to SI units
acre-foot	ac ft	≡ 1 ac x 1 ft = 43560 ft^{3}	= 1233.48183754752 m^{3}
acre-inch		≡ 1 ac × 1 in	= 102.79015312896 m^{3}
barrel (imperial)	bl (imp)	≡ 36 gal (imp)	= 0.16365924 m^{3}
barrel (petroleum); archaic blue-barrel	bl; bbl	≡ 42 gal (US)	≡ 0.158987294928 m^{3}
barrel (US dry)	bl (US)	≡ 105 qt (US) = 105/32 bu (US lvl)	= 0.115628198985075 m^{3}
barrel (US fluid)	fl bl (US)	≡ 31 1/2 gal (US)	= 0.119240471196 m^{3}
board-foot	bdft	≡ 144 in^{3}	≡ 2.359737216×10^{−3} m^{3}
bucket (imperial)	bkt	≡ 4 gal (imp)	= 0.01818436 m^{3}
bushel (imperial)	bu (imp)	≡ 8 gal (imp)	= 0.03636872 m^{3}
bushel (US dry heaped)	bu (US)	≡ 1 1/4 bu (US lvl)	= 0.0440488377086 m^{3}
bushel (US dry level)	bu (US lvl)	≡ 2150.42 in^{3}	= 0.03523907016688 m^{3}
butt, pipe		≡ 126 gal (US) (wine)	= 0.476961884784 m^{3}
coomb		≡ 4 bu (imp)	= 0.14547488 m^{3}
cord (firewood)		≡ 8 ft × 4 ft × 4 ft	= 3.624556363776 m^{3}
cord-foot		≡ 16 ft^{3}	= 0.453069545472 m^{3}
cubic fathom	cu fm	≡ 1 fm × 1 fm × 1 fm	= 6.116438863872 m^{3}
cubic foot	cu ft or ft^{3}	≡ 1 ft × 1 ft × 1 ft	≡ 0.028316846592 m^{3}
cubic inch	cu in or in^{3}	≡ 1 in × 1 in × 1 in	≡ 16.387064×10^{−6} m^{3}
cubic metre (SI unit)	m^{3}	≡ 1 m × 1 m × 1 m	≡ 1 m^{3}
cubic mile	cu mi or mi^{3}	≡ 1 mi × 1 mi × 1 mi	≡ 4168181825.440579584 m^{3}
cubic yard	yd^{3}	≡ 27 ft^{3}	≡ 0.764554857984 m^{3}
cup (breakfast)		≡ 10 fl oz (imp)	= 284.130625×10^{−6} m^{3}
cup (Canadian)	c (CA)	≡ 8 fl oz (imp)	= 227.3045×10^{−6} m^{3}
cup (metric)	c	≡ 250.0×10^{−6} m^{3}	≡ 250.0×10^{−6} m^{3}
cup (US customary)	c (US)	≡ 8 US fl oz ≡ 1/16 gal (US)	= 236.5882365×10^{−6} m^{3}
cup (US food nutrition labeling)	c (US)	≡ 240 mL	= 2.4×10^{−4} m^{3}
dash (imperial)		≡ 1/192 gi (imp) = 1/8 tsp (imp)	= 739.92350260416̅×10^{−9} m^{3}
dash (US)		≡ 1/48 US fl oz = 1/8 US tsp	= 616.11519921875×10^{−9} m^{3}
dessertspoon (imperial)		≡ 1/12 gi (imp)	= 11.8387760416̅×10^{−6} m^{3}
drop (imperial)	gtt	≡ 1/288 fl oz (imp)	= 98.6564670138̅×10^{−9} m^{3}
drop (imperial) (alt)	gtt	≡ 1/1824 gi (imp)	≈ 77.886684×10^{−9} m^{3}
drop (medical)		≡ 1/12 mL	= 83.3̅×10^{−9} m^{3}
drop (metric)		≡ 1/20 mL	= 50.0×10^{−9} m^{3}
drop (US)	gtt	≡ 1/360 US fl oz	= 82.14869322916̅×10^{−9} m^{3}
drop (US) (alt)	gtt	≡ 1/456 US fl oz	≈ 64.85423149671×10^{−9} m^{3}
drop (US) (alt)	gtt	≡ 1/576 US fl oz	≈ 51.34293326823×10^{−9} m^{3}
fifth		≡ 1/5 US gal	= 757.0823568×10^{−6} m^{3}
firkin		≡ 9 gal (imp)	= 0.04091481 m^{3}
fluid drachm (imperial)	fl dr	≡ 1/8 fl oz (imp)	= 3.5516328125×10^{−6} m^{3}
fluid dram (US); US fluidram	fl dr	≡ 1/8 US fl oz	= 3.6966911953125×10^{−6} m^{3}
fluid scruple (imperial)	fl s	≡ 1/24 fl oz (imp)	= 1.18387760416̅×10^{−6} m^{3}
gallon (beer)	beer gal	≡ 282 in^{3}	= 4.621152048×10^{−3} m^{3}
gallon (imperial)	gal (imp)	≡ 4.54609 L	≡ 4.54609×10^{−3} m^{3}
gallon (US dry)	gal (US)	≡ 1/8 bu (US lvl)	= 4.40488377086×10^{−3} m^{3}
gallon (US fluid; Wine)	gal (US)	≡ 231 in^{3}	≡ 3.785411784×10^{−3} m^{3}
gill (imperial); Noggin	gi (imp); nog	≡ 5 fl oz (imp)	= 142.0653125×10^{−6} m^{3}
gill (US)	gi (US)	≡ 4 US fl oz	= 118.29411825×10^{−6} m^{3}
hogshead (imperial)	hhd (imp)	≡ 2 bl (imp)	= 0.32731848 m^{3}
hogshead (US)	hhd (US)	≡ 2 fl bl (US)	= 0.238480942392 m^{3}
jigger (bartending)		≡ 1 1/2 US fl oz	≈ 44.36×10^{−6} m^{3}
kilderkin		≡ 18 gal (imp)	= 0.08182962 m^{3}
lambda	λ	≡ 1 mm^{3}	= 1×10^{−9} m^{3}
last		≡ 80 bu (imp)	= 2.9094976 m^{3}
litre (liter)	L or l	≡ 1 dm^{3}	≡ 0.001 m^{3}
load		≡ 50 ft^{3}	= 1.4158423296 m^{3}
minim (imperial)	min	≡ 1/480 fl oz (imp) = 1/60 fl dr (imp)	= 59.1938802083̅×10^{−9} m^{3}
minim (US)	min	≡ 1/480 US fl oz = 1/60 US fl dr	= 61.611519921875×10^{−9} m^{3}
ounce (fluid imperial)	fl oz (imp)	≡ 1/160 gal (imp)	≡ 28.4130625×10^{−6} m^{3}
ounce (fluid US customary)	US fl oz	≡ 1/128 gal (US)	≡ 29.5735295625×10^{−6} m^{3}
ounce (fluid US food nutrition labeling)	US fl oz	≡ 30 mL	≡ 3×10^{−5} m^{3}
peck (imperial)	pk	≡ 2 gal (imp)	= 9.09218×10^{−3} m^{3}
peck (US dry)	pk	≡ 1/4 US lvl bu	= 8.80976754172×10^{−3} m^{3}
perch	per	≡ 16 1/2 ft × 1 1/2 ft × 1 ft	= 0.700841953152 m^{3}
pinch (imperial)		≡ 1/384 gi (imp) = 1/2 dash (imp)	= 369.961751302083̅×10^{−9} m^{3}
pinch (US)		≡ 1/96 US fl oz = 1/2 US dash	= 308.057599609375×10^{−9} m^{3}
pint (imperial)	pt (imp)	≡ 1/8 gal (imp)	= 568.26125×10^{−6} m^{3}
pint (US dry)	pt (US dry)	≡ 1/64 bu (US lvl) ≡ 1/8 gal (US dry)	= 550.6104713575×10^{−6} m^{3}
pint (US fluid)	pt (US fl)	≡ 1/8 gal (US)	= 473.176473×10^{−6} m^{3}
pony		≡ 3/4 US fl oz	= 22.180147171875×10^{−6} m^{3}
pottle; quartern		≡ 1/2 gal (imp) = 80 fl oz (imp)	= 2.273045×10^{−3} m^{3}
quart (imperial)	qt (imp)	≡ 1/4 gal (imp)	= 1.1365225×10^{−3} m^{3}
quart (US dry)	qt (US)	≡ 1/32 bu (US lvl) = 1/4 gal (US dry)	= 1.101220942715×10^{−3} m^{3}
quart (US fluid)	qt (US)	≡ 1/4 gal (US fl)	= 946.352946×10^{−6} m^{3}
quarter; pail		≡ 8 bu (imp)	= 0.29094976 m^{3}
register ton		≡ 100 ft^{3}	= 2.8316846592 m^{3}
sack (US)		≡ 3 bu (US lvl)	= 0.10571721050064 m^{3}
seam		≡ 8 bu	= 0.29095 m^{3}
shot (US)		usually 1.5 US fl oz	≈ 44.4×10^{−6} m^{3}
strike (imperial)		≡ 2 bu (imp)	= 0.07273744 m^{3}
strike (US)		≡ 2 bu (US lvl)	= 0.07047814033376 m^{3}
tablespoon (Australian metric)			≡ 20.0×10^{−6} m^{3}
tablespoon (Canadian)	tbsp	≡ 1/2 fl oz (imp)	= 14.20653125×10^{−6} m^{3}
tablespoon (imperial)	tbsp	≡ 5/8 fl oz (imp)	= 17.7581640625×10^{−6} m^{3}
tablespoon (metric)			≡ 15×10^{−6} m^{3}
tablespoon (US customary)	tbsp	≡ 1/2 US fl oz	= 14.78676478125×10^{−6} m^{3}
tablespoon (US food nutrition labeling)	tbsp	≡ 15 mL	= 15×10^{−6} m^{3}
teaspoon (Canadian)	tsp	≡ 1/6 fl oz (imp)	= 4.735510416̅×10^{−6} m^{3}
teaspoon (imperial)	tsp	≡ 1/24 gi (imp)	= 5.91938802083̅×10^{−6} m^{3}
teaspoon (metric)		≡ 5.0×10^{−6} m^{3}	≡ 5.0×10^{−6} m^{3}
teaspoon (US customary)	tsp	≡ 1/6 US fl oz	= 4.92892159375×10^{−6} m^{3}
teaspoon (US food nutrition labeling)	tsp	≡ 5 mL	= 5×10^{−6} m^{3}
timber foot		≡ 1 ft^{3}	= 0.028316846592 m^{3}
ton (displacement)		≡ 35 ft^{3}	= 0.99108963072 m^{3}
ton (freight)		≡ 40 ft^{3}	= 1.13267386368 m^{3}
ton (water)		≡ 28 bu (imp)	= 1.01832416 m^{3}
tun		≡ 252 gal (wine)	= 0.953923769568 m^{3}
wey (US)		≡ 40 bu (US lvl)	= 1.4095628066752 m^{3}

== Plane angle ==
Plane angle
Name of unit	Symbol	Definition	Relation to SI units
NATO mil	(various)	≡ 2π/6400 rad	≈ 0.981748×10^{−3} rad
Swedish streck		≡ 2π/6300 rad	≈ 0.997302×10^{−3} rad
milliradian	mrad	≡ 1/1000 rad	≈ 1×10^{−3} rad
Warsaw Pact mil		≡ 2π/6000 rad	≈ 1.047167×10^{−3} rad
arcminute; MOA	'	≡ 1°/60	≈ 0.290888×10^{−3} rad
arcsecond	"	≡ 1°/3600	≈ 4.848137×10^{−6} rad
centesimal minute of arc	'	≡ 1/100 grad	≈ 0.157080×10^{−3} rad
centesimal second of arc	"	≡ 1/10000 grad	≈ 1.570796×10^{−6} rad
degree (of arc)	°	≡ 1/360 of a revolution ≡ π/180 rad	≈ 17.453293×10^{−3} rad
grad; gradian; gon	grad	≡ 1/400 of a revolution ≡ π/200 rad ≡ 0.9°	≈ 15.707963×10^{−3} rad
octant		≡ 45°	≈ 0.785398 rad
quadrant		≡ 90°	≈ 1.570796 rad
radian (SI unit)	rad	The angle subtended at the center of a circle by an arc whose length is equal to the circle's radius. One full revolution encompasses 2π radians.	= 1 rad
sextant		≡ 60°	≈ 1.047198 rad
sign		≡ 30°	≈ 0.523599 rad

== Solid angle ==
Solid angle
Name of unit	Symbol	Definition	Relation to SI units
spat		≡ 4π sr – The solid angle subtended by a sphere at its centre.	≈ 12.56637 sr
square degree	deg^{2}; sq.deg.; (°)^{2}	≡ (π/180)^{2} sr	≈ 0.30462×10^{−3} sr
steradian (SI unit)	sr	The solid angle subtended at the center of a sphere of radius r by a portion of the sphere having an area r^{2}. A sphere subtends 4π sr.	= 1 sr

== Mass ==
Notes:

- See Weight for detail of mass/weight distinction and conversion.
- Avoirdupois is a system of mass based on a pound of 16 ounces, while Troy weight is the system of mass where 12 troy ounces equals one troy pound.
- The symbol g_{0} is used to denote standard gravity in order to avoid confusion with the (upright) g symbol for gram.

Mass
Name of unit	Symbol	Definition	Relation to SI units
atomic mass unit, unified	u; AMU	Same as dalton (see below)	≈ 1.66053906892(52)×10^{−27} kg
atomic unit of mass, electron rest mass	m_{e}		≈ 9.1093837139(28)×10^{−31} kg
bag (coffee)		≡ 60 kg	= 60 kg
bag (Portland cement)		≡ 94 lb av	= 42.63768278 kg
barge		≡ 22 1/2 short ton	= 20411.65665 kg
carat	kt	≡ 3 1/6 gr	= 205.1965483̅ mg
carat (metric)	ct	≡ 200 mg	= 200 mg
clove		≡ 8 lb av	= 3.62873896 kg
crith		≡ mass of 1 L of hydrogen gas at STP	≈ 89.9349 mg
dalton	Da	1/12 the mass of an unbound neutral atom of carbon-12 in its nuclear and electronic ground state and at rest	≈ 1.66053906892(52)×10^{−27} kg
dram (apothecary; troy)	dr t	≡ 60 gr	= 3.8879346 g
dram (avoirdupois)	dr av	≡ 27 11/32 gr	= 1.7718451953125 g
electronvolt mass-equivalent	eV/c^{2}	≡ 1 eV / c^{2}	= 1.78266184(45)×10^{−36} kg
gamma	γ	≡ 1 μg	= 1 μg
grain	gr	≡ 1/7000 lb av	≡ 64.79891 mg
grave	gv	grave was the original name of the kilogram	≡ 1 kg
hundredweight (long)	long cwt or cwt	≡ 112 lb av	= 50.80234544 kg
hundredweight (short); cental	sh cwt	≡ 100 lb av	= 45.359237 kg
hyl; metric slug		≡ 1 kgf / 1 m/s^{2}	= 9.80665 kg
kilogram (kilogramme)	kg	≈ mass of the prototype near Paris ≈ mass of 1 litre of water	(SI base unit)
kip	kip	≡ 1000 lb av	= 453.59237 kg
mark		≡ 8 oz t	= 248.8278144 g
mite		≡ 1/20 gr	= 3.2399455 mg
mite (metric)		≡ 1/20 g	= 50 mg
ounce (apothecary; troy)	oz t	≡ 1/12 lb t	= 31.1034768 g
ounce (avoirdupois)	oz av	≡ 1/16 lb	= 28.349523125 g
ounce (US food nutrition labelling)	oz	≡ 28 g	= 28 g
pennyweight	dwt; pwt	≡ 1/20 oz t	= 1.55517384 g
point		≡ 1/100 ct	= 2 mg
pound (avoirdupois)	lb av	≡ 0.45359237 kg = 7000 grains	≡ 0.45359237 kg
pound (metric)		≡ 500 g	= 500 g
pound (troy)	lb t	≡ 5760 grains	= 0.3732417216 kg
quarter (imperial)		≡ 1/4 long cwt = 2 st = 28 lb av	= 12.70058636 kg
quarter (informal)		≡ 1/4 short ton	= 226.796185 kg
quarter, long (informal)		≡ 1/4 long ton	= 254.0117272 kg
quintal (metric)	q	≡ 100 kg	= 100 kg
scruple (apothecary)	s ap	≡ 20 gr	= 1.2959782 g
sheet		≡ 1/700 lb av	= 647.9891 mg
slug; geepound	slug	≡ g_{0} × 1 lb av × 1 s^{2}/ft	≈ 14.593903 kg
stone	st	≡ 14 lb av	= 6.35029318 kg
ton, assay (long)	AT	≡ 1 mg × 1 long ton ÷ 1 oz t	= 32.6̅ g
ton, assay (short)	AT	≡ 1 mg × 1 short ton ÷ 1 oz t	= 29.16̅ g
ton, long	long tn or ton	≡ 2240 lb	= 1016.0469088 kg
ton, short	sh tn	≡ 2000 lb	= 907.18474 kg
tonne (mts unit)	t	≡ 1000 kg	= 1000 kg
wey		≡ 252 lb = 18 st	= 114.30527724 kg (variants exist)
zentner	Ztr.	Definitions vary.	

== Density ==
Density
Name of unit	Symbol	Definition	Relation to SI units
gram per millilitre	g/mL	≡ g/mL	= 1000 kg/m^{3}
kilogram per cubic metre (SI unit)	kg/m^{3}	≡ kg/m^{3}	= 1 kg/m^{3}
kilogram per litre	kg/L	≡ kg/L	= 1000 kg/m^{3}
ounce (avoirdupois) per cubic foot	oz/ft^{3}	≡ oz/ft^{3}	≈ 1.001153961 kg/m^{3}
ounce (avoirdupois) per cubic inch	oz/in^{3}	≡ oz/in^{3}	≈ 1.729994044×10^{3} kg/m^{3}
ounce (avoirdupois) per gallon (imperial)	oz/gal	≡ oz/gal	≈ 6.236023291 kg/m^{3}
ounce (avoirdupois) per gallon (US fluid)	oz/gal	≡ oz/gal	≈ 7.489151707 kg/m^{3}
pound (avoirdupois) per cubic foot	lb/ft^{3}	≡ lb/ft^{3}	≈ 16.01846337 kg/m^{3}
pound (avoirdupois) per cubic inch	lb/in^{3}	≡ lb/in^{3}	≈ 2.767990471×10^{4} kg/m^{3}
pound (avoirdupois) per gallon (imperial)	lb/gal	≡ lb/gal	≈ 99.77637266 kg/m^{3}
pound (avoirdupois) per gallon (US fluid)	lb/gal	≡ lb/gal	≈ 119.8264273 kg/m^{3}
slug per cubic foot	slug/ft^{3}	≡ slug/ft^{3}	≈ 515.3788184 kg/m^{3}

== Time ==
Time
Name of unit	Symbol	Definition	Relation to SI units
atomic unit of time	a.u.	≡ a_{0}/(α⋅c)	≈ 2.418884254×10^{−17} s
Callippic cycle		≡ 441 mo (hollow) + 499 mo (full) = 76 a of 365.25 d	= 2.396736 Gs or 2.3983776 Gs (Note: see Callippic cycle for explanation of the differences)
century	c	≡ 100 years (100 a)	= 3.1556952 Gs (Note: This is based on the average Gregorian year. See above for definition of year lengths.) (Note: Where UTC is observed, the length of this unit may increase or decrease depending on the number of leap seconds which occur during the time interval in question.)
day	d	= 24 h = 1440 min	= 86.4 ks
day (sidereal)	d	≡ Time needed for the Earth to rotate once around its axis, determined from successive transits of a very distant astronomical object across an observer's meridian (International Celestial Reference Frame)	≈ 86.1641 ks
decade	dec	≡ 10 years (10 a)	= 315.569520 Ms
fortnight	fn	≡ 2 wk	= 1.2096 Ms
helek		≡ 1/1080 h	= 3.3̅ s
Hipparchic cycle		≡ 4 Callippic cycles - 1 d	= 9.593424 Gs
hour	h	≡ 60 min	= 3.6 ks
jiffy	j	≡ 1/60 s	= 16.6̅ ms
jiffy (alternative)	ja	≡ 1/100 s	= 10 ms
kè (quarter of an hour)		≡ 1/4 h = 1/96 d = 15 min	= 900 s
kè (traditional)		≡ 1/100 d = 14.4 min	= 864 s
lustre; lūstrum		≡ 5 a of 365 d (Note: The length of ancient lustral cycles was not constant; see Lustrum for more details)	= 157.68 Ms
Metonic cycle; enneadecaeteris		≡ 110 mo (hollow) + 125 mo (full) = 6940 d ≈ 19 a	= 599.616 Ms
millennium		≡ 1000 years (1000 a)	= 31.556952 Gs
milliday	md	≡ 1/1000 d	= 86.4 s
minute	min	≡ 60 s, due to leap seconds sometimes 59 s or 61 s,	= 60 s
moment		≡ 90 s	= 90 s
month (full)	mo	≡ 30 d	= 2.592×10^{6} s
month (Greg. av.)	mo	= 30.436875 d	≈ 2.6297 Ms
month (hollow)	mo	≡ 29 d	= 2.5056 Ms
Month (synodic)	mo	Cycle time of moon phases ≈ 29.530589 d (average)	≈ 2.551 Ms
octaeteris		= 48 mo (full) + 48 mo (hollow) + 3 mo (full) = 8 a of 365.25 d = 2922 d	= 252.4608 Ms
Planck time		≡ (Gℏ/c^{5})^{1/2}	≈ 5.39116×10^{−44} s
second (SI base unit)	s	≡ Time of 9192631770 periods of the radiation corresponding to the transition between the two hyperfine levels of the ground state of the caesium-133 atom at 0 K (but other seconds are sometimes used in astronomy). Also that time it takes for light to travel a distance of 299792458 metres.	(SI base unit)
shake		≡ 10^{−8} s	= 10 ns
sigma		≡ 10^{−6} s	= 1 μs
Sothic cycle		≡ 1461 a of 365 d	= 46.074096 Gs
svedberg	S	≡ 10^{−13} s	= 100 fs
week	wk	≡ 7 d = 168 h = 10080 min	= 604.8 ks
year (common)	a, y, or yr	365 d	= 31.536 Ms
year (Gregorian)	a, y, or yr	= 365.2425 d average, calculated from common years (365 d) plus leap years (366 d) on most years divisible by 4. See leap year for details.	= 31.556952 Ms
year (Julian)	a, y, or yr	= 365.25 d average, calculated from common years (365 d) plus one leap year (366 d) every four years	= 31.5576 Ms
year (Julian)	a, y, or yr	= 365.25 d average, calculated from common years (365 d) plus one leap year (366 d) every four years	= 31.5576 Ms
year (mean tropical)	a, y, or yr	Conceptually, the length of time it takes for the Sun to return to the same position in the cycle of seasons, (Note: The technical definition of tropical year is the period of time for the ecliptic longitude of the Sun to increase 360 degrees. (Urban & Seidelmann 2013, Glossary, s.v. year, tropical)) approximately 365.24219 d, each day being 86400 SI seconds	≈ 31.556925 Ms
year (sidereal)	a, y, or yr	≡ Time taken for Sun to return to the same position with respect to the stars of the celestial sphere, approximately 365.256363 d	≈ 31.5581497632 Ms

== Frequency ==
Frequency
Name of unit	Symbol	Definition	Relation to SI units
actions per minute	APM	≡ 1/60 Hz	≈ 0.0167 Hz
cycle per second	cps	≡ 1 Hz	= 1 cps = 1 Hz
degree per second	deg/s	≡ 1 °/s ≡ 1/360 Hz	= 0.0027̅ Hz
hertz (SI unit)	Hz	≡ One cycle per second	= 1 Hz = 1/s
radian per second	rad/s	≡ 1/(2π) Hz	≈ 0.159155 Hz
revolution per minute	rpm	≡ One rpm equals one rotation completed around a fixed axis in one minute of time.	≈ 0.104719755 rad/s

== Speed or velocity ==
Speed
Name of unit	Symbol	Definition	Relation to SI units
foot per hour	fph	≡ 1 ft/h	= 8.46̅×10^{−5} m/s
foot per minute	fpm	≡ 1 ft/min	= 5.08×10^{−3} m/s
foot per second	fps	≡ 1 ft/s	= 3.048×10^{−1} m/s
furlong per fortnight		≡ furlong/fortnight	≈ 1.663095×10^{−4} m/s
inch per hour	iph	≡ 1 in/h	= 7.05̅×10^{−6} m/s
inch per minute	ipm	≡ 1 in/min	= 4.23̅×10^{−4} m/s
inch per second	ips	≡ 1 in/s	= 2.54×10^{−2} m/s
kilometre per hour	km/h	≡ 1 km/h	= 2.7̅×10^{−1} m/s
knot	kn	≡ 1 nmi/h = 1.852 km/h	= 0.514̅ m/s
knot (Admiralty)	kn	≡ 1 NM (Adm)/h = 1.853184 km/h	= 0.514773̅ m/s
mach number	M	Ratio of the speed to the speed of sound (Note: The speed of sound varies especially with temperature and pressure from about 340 m/s (1,225 km/h or 761 mph or 661 kn) in air at sea level to about 300 m/s (1,062 km/h or 660 mph or 573 kn) at jet altitudes (12200 m or 40000 ft).) in the medium (unitless).	≈ 340 m/s in air at sea level ≈ 295 m/s in air at jet altitudes
metre per second (SI unit)	m/s	≡ 1 m/s	= 1 m/s
mile per hour	mph	≡ 1 mi/h	= 0.44704 m/s
mile per minute	mpm	≡ 1 mi/min	= 26.8224 m/s
mile per second	mps	≡ 1 mi/s	= 1609.344 m/s
speed of light in vacuum	c	≡ 299792458 m/s	= 299792458 m/s
speed of sound in air	s	1225 to 1062 km/h (761–660 mph or 661–574 kn)	≈ 340 to 295 m/s
Note

A velocity consists of a speed combined with a direction; the speed part of the velocity takes units of speed.

== Flow (volume) ==
Volumetric flow rate
Name of unit	Symbol	Definition	Relation to SI units
cubic foot per minute	CFM	≡ 1 ft^{3}/min	= 4.719474432×10^{−4} m^{3}/s
cubic foot per second	ft^{3}/s	≡ 1 ft^{3}/s	= 0.028316846592 m^{3}/s
cubic inch per minute	in^{3}/min	≡ 1 in^{3}/min	= 2.7311773̅×10^{−7} m^{3}/s
cubic inch per second	in^{3}/s	≡ 1 in^{3}/s	= 1.6387064×10^{−5} m^{3}/s
cubic metre per second (SI unit)	m^{3}/s	≡ 1 m^{3}/s	= 1 m^{3}/s
gallon (US fluid) per day	GPD	≡ 1 gal/d	= 4.381263638̅×10^{−8} m^{3}/s
gallon (US fluid) per hour	GPH	≡ 1 gal/h	= 1.051503273̅×10^{−6} m^{3}/s
gallon (US fluid) per minute	GPM	≡ 1 gal/min	= 6.30901964×10^{−5} m^{3}/s
litre per minute	l/min or L/min	≡ 1 L/min	= 1.6̅×10^{−5} m^{3}/s

== Acceleration ==
Acceleration
Name of unit	Symbol	Definition	Relation to SI units
foot per hour per second	fph/s	≡ 1 ft/(h⋅s)	= 8.46̅×10^{−5} m/s^{2}
foot per minute per second	fpm/s	≡ 1 ft/(min⋅s)	= 5.08×10^{−3} m/s^{2}
foot per second squared	fps^{2}	≡ 1 ft/s^{2}	= 3.048×10^{−1} m/s^{2}
gal; galileo	Gal	≡ 1 cm/s^{2}	= 10^{−2} m/s^{2}
inch per minute per second	ipm/s	≡ 1 in/(min⋅s)	= 4.23̅×10^{−4} m/s^{2}
inch per second squared	ips^{2}	≡ 1 in/s^{2}	= 2.54×10^{−2} m/s^{2}
knot per second	kn/s	≡ 1 kn/s	≈ 5.14̅×10^{−1} m/s^{2}
metre per second squared (SI unit)	m/s^{2}	≡ 1 m/s^{2}	= 1 m/s^{2}
mile per hour per second	mph/s	≡ 1 mi/(h⋅s)	= 4.4704×10^{−1} m/s^{2}
mile per minute per second	mpm/s	≡ 1 mi/(min⋅s)	= 26.8224 m/s^{2}
mile per second squared	mps^{2}	≡ 1 mi/s^{2}	= 1.609344×10^{3} m/s^{2}
standard gravity	g_{0}	≡ 9.80665 m/s^{2}	= 9.80665 m/s^{2}

== Force ==
Force
Name of unit	Symbol	Definition	Relation to SI units
atomic unit of force		≡ m_{e}⋅α^{2}⋅c^{2}/a_{0}	≈ 8.23872206×10^{−8} N
dyne (CGS unit)	dyn	≡ g⋅cm/s^{2}	= 10^{−5} N
kilogram-force; kilopond; grave-force	kgf; kp; gvf	≡ g_{0} × 1 kg	= 9.80665 N
kip; kip-force	kip; kipf; klbf	≡ g_{0} × 1000 lb	= 4.4482216152605×10^{3} N
milligrave-force, gravet-force	mgvf; gvtf	≡ g_{0} × 1 g	= 9.80665 mN
long ton-force	tnf	≡ g_{0} × 1 long ton	= 9.96401641818352×10^{3} N
newton (SI unit)	N	A force capable of giving a mass of one kilogram an acceleration of one metre per second per second.	= 1 N = 1 kg⋅m/s^{2}
ounce-force	ozf	≡ g_{0} × 1 oz	= 0.27801385095378125 N
pound-force	lbf	≡ g_{0} × 1 lb	= 4.4482216152605 N
poundal	pdl	≡ 1 lb⋅ft/s^{2}	= 0.138254954376 N
short ton-force	tnf	≡ g_{0} × 1 short ton	= 8.896443230521×10^{3} N
sthene (mts unit)	sn	≡ 1 t⋅m/s^{2}	= 10^{3} N

== Pressure or mechanical stress ==
Pressure
Name of unit	Symbol	Definition	Relation to SI units
atmosphere (standard)	atm		≡ 101325 Pa
atmosphere (technical)	at	≡ 1 kgf/cm^{2}	= 9.80665×10^{4} Pa
bar	bar	≡ 100000 Pa	≡ 10^{5} Pa
barye (CGS unit)		≡ 1 dyn/cm^{2}	= 0.1 Pa
centimetre of mercury	cmHg	≡ 13595.1 kg/m^{3} × 1 cm × g_{0}	≈ 1.33322×10^{3} Pa
centimetre of water (4 °C)	cmH_{2}O	≈ 999.972 kg/m^{3} × 1 cm × g_{0}	≈ 98.0638 Pa
foot of mercury (conventional)	ftHg	≡ 13595.1 kg/m^{3} × 1 ft × g_{0}	≈ 4.063666×10^{4} Pa
foot of water (39.2 °F)	ftH_{2}O	≈ 999.972 kg/m^{3} × 1 ft × g_{0}	≈ 2.98898×10^{3} Pa
inch of mercury (conventional)	inHg	≡ 13595.1 kg/m^{3} × 1 in × g_{0}	≈ 3.386389×10^{3} Pa
inch of water (39.2 °F)	inH_{2}O	≈ 999.972 kg/m^{3} × 1 in × g_{0}	≈ 249.082 Pa
kilogram-force per square millimetre	kgf/mm^{2}	≡ 1 kgf/mm^{2}	= 9.80665×10^{6} Pa
kip per square inch	ksi	≡ 1 kipf/sq in	≈ 6.894757×10^{6} Pa
long ton per square foot		≡ 1 long ton × g_{0} / 1 sq ft	≈ 1.0725178011595×10^{5} Pa
micrometre of mercury	μmHg	≡ 13595.1 kg/m^{3} × 1 μm × g_{0} ≈ 0.001 torr	≈ 0.1333224 Pa
millimetre of mercury	mmHg	≡ 13595.1 kg/m^{3} × 1 mm × g_{0} ≈ 1 torr	≈ 133.3224 Pa
millimetre of water (3.98 °C)	mmH_{2}O	≈ 999.972 kg/m^{3} × 1 mm × g_{0} = 0.999972 kgf/m^{2}	= 9.80638 Pa
pascal (SI unit)	Pa	≡ N/m^{2} = kg/(m⋅s^{2})	= 1 Pa
pièze (mts unit)	pz	≡ 1000 kg/m⋅s^{2}	= 10^{3} Pa = 1 kPa
pound per square foot	psf	≡ 1 lbf/ft^{2}	≈ 47.88026 Pa
pound per square inch	psi	≡ 1 lbf/in^{2}	≈ 6.894757×10^{3} Pa
poundal per square foot	pdl/sq ft	≡ 1 pdl/sq ft	≈ 1.488164 Pa
short ton per square foot		≡ 1 short ton × g_{0} / 1 sq ft	≈ 9.5760518×10^{4} Pa
torr	torr	≡ 101325/760 Pa	≈ 133.3224 Pa

== Torque or moment of force ==
Torque
Name of unit	Symbol	Definition	Relation to SI units
pound-force-foot	lbf⋅ft	≡ g_{0} × 1 lb × 1 ft	= 1.3558179483314004 N⋅m
poundal-ft	pdl⋅ft	≡ 1 lb⋅ft^{2}/s^{2}	= 4.21401100938048×10^{−2} N⋅m
pound force-inch	lbf⋅in	≡ g_{0} × 1 lb × 1 in	= 0.1129848290276167 N⋅m
kilogram force-meter	kgf⋅m	≡ g_{0} × N × m	= 9.80665 N⋅m
newton-metre (SI unit)	N⋅m	≡ N × m = kg⋅m^{2}/s^{2}	= 1 N⋅m

== Energy ==
Energy
Name of unit	Symbol	Definition	Relation to SI units
barrel of oil equivalent	boe	≈ 5.8×10^{6} BTU_{59 °F}	≈ 6.12×10^{9} J
British thermal unit (ISO)	BTU_{ISO}	≡ 1.0545×10^{3} J	= 1.0545×10^{3} J
British thermal unit (International Table)	BTU_{IT}		= 1.05505585262×10^{3} J
British thermal unit (mean)	BTU_{mean}		≈ 1.05587×10^{3} J
British thermal unit (thermochemical)	BTU_{th}		≈ 1.054350×10^{3} J
British thermal unit (39 °F)	BTU_{39 °F}		≈ 1.05967×10^{3} J
British thermal unit (59 °F)	BTU_{59 °F}	≡ 1.054804×10^{3} J	= 1.054804×10^{3} J
British thermal unit (60 °F)	BTU_{60 °F}		≈ 1.05468×10^{3} J
British thermal unit (63 °F)	BTU_{63 °F}		≈ 1.0546×10^{3} J
calorie (International Table)	cal_{IT}	≡ 4.1868 J	= 4.1868 J
calorie (mean)	cal_{mean}	1/100 of the energy required to warm one gram of air-free water from 0 °C to 100 °C at a pressure of 1 atm	≈ 4.19002 J
calorie (thermochemical)	cal_{th}	≡ 4.184 J	= 4.184 J
Calorie (US; FDA)	Cal	≡ 1 kcal = 1000 cal	= 4184 J
calorie (3.98 °C)	cal_{3.98 °C}		≈ 4.2045 J
calorie (15 °C)	cal_{15 °C}	≡ 4.1855 J	= 4.1855 J
calorie (20 °C)	cal_{20 °C}		≈ 4.1819 J
Celsius heat unit (International Table)	CHU_{IT}	≡ 1 BTU_{IT} × 1 K/°R	= 1.899100534716×10^{3} J
cubic centimetre of atmosphere; standard cubic centimetre	cc atm; scc	≡ 1 atm × 1 cm^{3}	= 0.101325 J
cubic foot of atmosphere; standard cubic foot	cu ft atm; scf	≡ 1 atm × 1 ft^{3}	= 2.8692044809344×10^{3} J
cubic foot of natural gas		≡ 1000 BTU_{IT}	= 1.05505585262×10^{6} J
cubic yard of atmosphere; standard cubic yard	cu yd atm; scy	≡ 1 atm × 1 yd^{3}	= 77.4685209852288×10^{3} J
electronvolt	eV	≡ e × 1 V	≡ 1.602176634×10^{−19} J
erg (CGS unit)	erg	≡ 1 g⋅cm^{2}/s^{2}	= 10^{−7} J
foot-pound force	ft lbf	≡ g_{0} × 1 lb × 1 ft	= 1.3558179483314004 J
foot-poundal	ft pdl	≡ 1 lb⋅ft^{2}/s^{2}	= 4.21401100938048×10^{−2} J
gallon-atmosphere (imperial)	imp gal atm	≡ 1 atm × 1 gal (imp)	= 460.63256925 J
gallon-atmosphere (US)	US gal atm	≡ 1 atm × 1 gal (US)	= 383.5568490138 J
hartree, atomic unit of energy	E_{h}	≡ m_{e}⋅α^{2}⋅c^{2} (= 2 Ry)	≈ 4.359744×10^{−18} J
horsepower-hour	hp⋅h	≡ 1 hp × 1 h	= 2.684519537696172792×10^{6} J
inch-pound force	in lbf	≡ g_{0} × 1 lb × 1 in	= 0.1129848290276167 J
joule (SI unit)	J	The work done when a force of one newton moves the point of its application a distance of one metre in the direction of the force.	= 1 J = 1 m⋅N = 1 kg⋅m^{2}/s^{2} = 1 C⋅V = 1 W⋅s
kilocalorie; large calorie	kcal; Cal	≡ 1000 cal_{IT}	= 4.1868×10^{3} J
kilowatt-hour; Board of Trade Unit	kW⋅h; B.O.T.U.	≡ 1 kW × 1 h	= 3.6×10^{6} J
litre-atmosphere	l atm; sl	≡ 1 atm × 1 L	= 101.325 J
quad		≡ 10^{15} BTU_{IT}	= 1.05505585262×10^{18} J
rydberg	Ry	≡ R_{∞}⋅ℎ⋅c	≈ 2.179872×10^{−18} J
therm (E.C.)		≡ 100000 BTU_{IT}	= 105.505585262×10^{6} J
therm (US)		≡ 100000 BTU_{59 °F}	= 105.4804×10^{6} J
thermie	th	≡ 1 Mcal_{IT}	= 4.1868×10^{6} J
tonne of coal equivalent	TCE	≡ 7 Gcal_{th}	= 29.288×10^{9} J
tonne of oil equivalent	toe	≡ 10 Gcal_{IT}	= 41.868×10^{9} J
ton of TNT	tTNT	≡ 1 Gcal_{th}	= 4.184×10^{9} J
watt-hour	W⋅h	≡ 1 W × 1 h	= 3.6×10^{3} J
watt-second	W⋅s	≡ 1 J	= 1×10^{0} J

== Power or heat flow rate ==
Power
Name of unit	Symbol	Definition	Relation to SI units
atmosphere-cubic centimetre per minute	atm ccm	≡ 1 atm × 1 cm^{3}/min	= 1.68875×10^{−3} W
atmosphere-cubic centimetre per second	atm ccs	≡ 1 atm × 1 cm^{3}/s	= 0.101325 W
atmosphere-cubic foot per hour	atm cfh	≡ 1 atm × 1 ft^{3}/h	= 0.79700124704 W
atmosphere-cubic foot per minute	atm cfm	≡ 1 atm × 1 ft^{3}/min	= 47.82007468224 W
atmosphere-cubic foot per second	atm cfs	≡ 1 atm × 1 ft^{3}/s	= 2.8692044809344×10^{3} W
BTU (International Table) per hour	BTU_{IT}/h	≡ 1 BTU_{IT}/h	≈ 0.293071 W
BTU (International Table) per minute	BTU_{IT}/min	≡ 1 BTU_{IT}/min	≈ 17.584264 W
BTU (International Table) per second	BTU_{IT}/s	≡ 1 BTU_{IT}/s	= 1.05505585262×10^{3} W
calorie (International Table) per second	cal_{IT}/s	≡ 1 cal_{IT}/s	= 4.1868 W
erg per second	erg/s	≡ 1 erg/s	= 10^{−7} W
foot-pound-force per hour	ft⋅lbf/h	≡ 1 ft lbf/h	≈ 3.766161×10^{−4} W
foot-pound-force per minute	ft⋅lbf/min	≡ 1 ft lbf/min	= 2.259696580552334×10^{−2} W
foot-pound-force per second	ft⋅lbf/s	≡ 1 ft lbf/s	= 1.3558179483314004 W
horsepower (boiler)	hp	≈ 34.5 lb/h × 970.3 BTU_{IT}/lb	≈ 9809.5 W
horsepower (European electrical)	hp	≡ 75 kp⋅m/s	= 736 W
horsepower (electrical)	hp	≡ 746 W	= 746 W
horsepower (mechanical)	hp	≡ 550 ft⋅lbf/s	= 745.69987158227022 W
horsepower (metric)	hp or PS	≡ 75 m⋅kgf/s	= 735.49875 W
litre-atmosphere per minute	L·atm/min	≡ 1 atm × 1 L/min	= 1.68875 W
litre-atmosphere per second	L·atm/s	≡ 1 atm × 1 L/s	= 101.325 W
lusec	lusec	≡ 1 L·μmHg/s	≈ 1.333×10^{−4} W
poncelet	p	≡ 100 m⋅kgf/s	= 980.665 W
square foot equivalent direct radiation	sq ft EDR	≡ 240 BTU_{IT}/h	≈ 70.337057 W
ton of air conditioning		≡ 2000 lb of ice melted / 24 h	≈ 3504 W
ton of refrigeration (imperial)		≡ 2240 lb × ice_{IT} / 24 h: ice_{IT} = 144 °F × 2326 J/kg⋅°F	≈ 3.938875×10^{3} W
ton of refrigeration (IT)		≡ 2000 lb × ice_{IT} / 24 h: ice_{IT} = 144 °F × 2326 J/kg⋅°F	≈ 3.516853×10^{3} W
watt (SI unit)	W	The power which in one second of time gives rise to one joule of energy.	= 1 W = 1 J/s = 1 N⋅m/s = 1 kg⋅m^{2}/s^{3}

== Action ==
Action
Name of unit	Symbol	Definition	Relation to SI units
atomic unit of action	au	≡ ℏ ≡ ℎ/2π	≈ 1.05457168×10^{−34} J⋅s

== Dynamic viscosity ==
Dynamic viscosity
Name of unit	Symbol	Definition	Relation to SI units
pascal second (SI unit)	Pa⋅s	≡ N⋅s/m^{2}, kg/(m⋅s)	= 1 Pa⋅s
poise (CGS unit)	P	≡ 1 barye⋅s	= 0.1 Pa⋅s
pound per foot hour	lb/(ft⋅h)	≡ 1 lb/(ft⋅h)	≈ 4.133789×10^{−4} Pa⋅s
pound per foot second	lb/(ft⋅s)	≡ 1 lb/(ft⋅s)	≈ 1.488164 Pa⋅s
pound-force second per square foot	lbf⋅s/ft^{2}	≡ 1 lbf⋅s/ft^{2}	≈ 47.88026 Pa⋅s
pound-force second per square inch	lbf⋅s/in^{2}	≡ 1 lbf⋅s/in^{2}	≈ 6894.757 Pa⋅s

== Kinematic viscosity ==
Kinematic viscosity
Name of unit	Symbol	Definition	Relation to SI units
square foot per second	ft^{2}/s	≡ 1 ft^{2}/s	= 0.09290304 m^{2}/s
square metre per second (SI unit)	m^{2}/s	≡ 1 m^{2}/s	= 1 m^{2}/s
stokes (CGS unit)	St	≡ 1 cm^{2}/s	= 10^{−4} m^{2}/s

== Electric current ==
Electric current
Name of unit	Symbol	Definition	Relation to SI units
ampere (SI base unit)	A	≡ one coulomb of charge going past a given point per second.	(SI base unit)
electromagnetic unit; abampere (CGS unit)	abamp	≘ 10 A	= 10 A
esu per second; statampere (CGS unit)	esu/s	≘ (10 A⋅cm/s) / c	≈ 3.335641×10^{−10} A

== Electric charge ==
Electric charge
Name of unit	Symbol	Definition	Relation to SI units
abcoulomb; electromagnetic unit (CGS unit)	abC; emu	≘ 10 C	= 10 C
atomic unit of charge	au	≡ e	= 1.602176634×10^{−19} C
coulomb	C	≡ charge of exactly 1/(1.602176634×10^{−19}) elementary charges	= 1 C = 1 A⋅s
faraday	F	≡ 1 mol × N_{A}⋅e	≈ 96485.3383 C
milliampere hour	mA⋅h	≡ 0.001 A × 1 h	= 3.6 C
statcoulomb; franklin; electrostatic unit (CGS unit)	statC; Fr; esu	≘ (10 A⋅cm) / c	≈ 3.335641×10^{−10} C

== Electric dipole ==
Electric dipole
Name of unit	Symbol	Definition	Relation to SI units
atomic unit of electric dipole moment	ea_{0}		≈ 8.47835281×10^{−30} C⋅m
coulomb-meter	C⋅m		= 1 C⋅m
debye	D	≡ 10^{−10} esu⋅Å	≘ 3.33564095×10^{−30} C⋅m

== Electromotive force, electric potential difference ==
Voltage, electromotive force
Name of unit	Symbol	Definition	Relation to SI units
abvolt (CGS unit)	abV	≘ 10^{−8} V	= 10^{−8} V
statvolt (CGS unit)	statV	≘ c⋅(1 μJ/A⋅m)	= 299.792458 V
volt (SI unit)	V	The difference in electric potential across two points along a conducting wire carrying one ampere of constant current when the power dissipated between the points equals one watt.	= 1 V = 1 W/A = 1 kg⋅m^{2}/(A⋅s^{3}) = 1 J/C

== Electrical resistance ==
Electrical resistance
Name of unit	Symbol	Definition	Relation to SI units
ohm (SI unit)	Ω	The resistance between two points in a conductor when one volt of electric potential difference, applied to these points, produces one ampere of current in the conductor.	= 1 Ω = 1 V/A = 1 kg⋅m^{2}/(A^{2}⋅s^{3})

== Capacitance ==
Capacitor's ability to store charge
Name of unit	Symbol	Definition	Relation to SI units
farad (SI unit)	F	The capacitance between two parallel plates that results in one volt of potential difference when charged by one coulomb of electricity.	= 1 F = 1 C/V = 1 A^{2}⋅s^{4}/(kg⋅m^{2})

== Magnetic flux ==
Magnetic flux
Name of unit	Symbol	Definition	Relation to SI units
maxwell (CGS unit)	Mx	≘ 10^{−8} Wb	= 10^{−8} Wb
weber (SI unit)	Wb	Magnetic flux which, linking a circuit of one turn, would produce in it an electromotive force of 1 volt if it were reduced to zero at a uniform rate in 1 second.	= 1 Wb = 1 V⋅s = 1 kg⋅m^{2}/(A⋅s^{2})

== Magnetic flux density ==
What physicists call magnetic field is called magnetic flux density by electrical engineers and magnetic induction by applied mathematicians and electrical engineers.
Name of unit	Symbol	Definition	Relation to SI units
gauss (CGS unit)	G	≡ Mx/cm^{2} ≘ 10^{−4} T	= 10^{−4} T
tesla (SI unit)	T	≡ Wb/m^{2}	= 1 T = 1 Wb/m^{2} = 1 kg/(A⋅s^{2})

== Inductance ==
Inductance
Name of unit	Symbol	Definition	Relation to SI units
henry (SI unit)	H	The inductance of a closed circuit that produces one volt of electromotive force when the current in the circuit varies at a uniform rate of one ampere per second.	= 1 H = 1 Wb/A = 1 kg⋅m^{2}/(A⋅s)^{2}

== Temperature ==
Temperature
Name of unit	Symbol	Definition	Relation to SI units
degree Celsius	°C	[°C] ≡ [K] − 273.15	[K] ≡ [°C] + 273.15
degree Delisle	°De		[K] = 373.15 − [°De] × 2/3
degree Fahrenheit	°F	[°F] ≡ [°C] × 9/5 + 32	[K] ≡ ([°F] + 459.67) × 5/9
degree Newton	°N		[K] = [°N] × 100/33 + 273.15
degree Rankine	°R;	[°R] ≡ [K] × 9/5	[K] ≡ [°R] × 5/9
degree Réaumur	°Ré		[K] = [°Ré] × 5/4 + 273.15
degree Rømer	°Rø		[K] = ([°Rø] − 7.5) × 40/21 + 273.15
Regulo Gas Mark	GM	[°F] ≡ [GM] × 25 + 250	[K] ≡ [GM] × 125/9 + 394.26
kelvin (SI base unit)	K	≡ change in the thermodynamic temperature T that results in a change of thermal energy kT by 1.380 649 × 10^{−23} J.	(SI base unit)

== Information entropy ==
Information entropy
Name of unit	Symbol	Definition	Relation to SI units	Relation to bits
natural unit of information; nit; nepit	nat			
shannon	Sh	≡ ln(2) × nat	≈ 0.693147 nat	= 1 bit
hartley; ban	Hart; ban	≡ ln(10) × nat	≈ 2.302585 nat	
bit	bit; b			= 1 bit
nibble		≡ 4 bits		= 2^{2} bit
byte	B	≡ 8 bits		= 2^{3} bit
kilobyte (decimal)	kB	≡ 1000 B		= 8000 bit
kibibyte (kilobyte)	KiB	≡ 1024 B		= 2^{13} bit = 8192 bit

Modern standards (such as ISO 80000) prefer the shannon to the bit as a unit for a quantity of information entropy, whereas the (discrete) storage space of digital devices is measured in bits. Thus, uncompressed redundant data occupy more than one bit of storage per shannon of information entropy. The multiples of a bit listed above are usually used with this meaning.

== Luminous intensity ==
The candela is the preferred nomenclature for the SI unit.

Luminous intensity
Name of unit	Symbol	Definition	Relation to SI units
candela (SI base unit)	cd	The luminous intensity, in a given direction, of a source that emits monochromatic radiation of frequency 540×10^{12} hertz and that has a radiant intensity in that direction of 1/683 watt per steradian.	(SI base unit)
candlepower (new)	cp	≡ cd The use of candlepower as a unit is discouraged due to its ambiguity.	= 1 cd
candlepower (old, pre-1948)	cp	Varies and is poorly reproducible. Approximately 0.981 cd.	≈ 0.981 cd

== Luminance ==
Luminance
Name of unit	Symbol	Definition	Relation to SI units
candela per square foot	cd/ft^{2}	≡ cd/ft^{2}	≈ 10.763910417 cd/m^{2}
candela per square inch	cd/in^{2}	≡ cd/in^{2}	≈ 1550.0031 cd/m^{2}
candela per square metre (SI unit); nit (deprecated)	cd/m^{2}	≡ cd/m^{2}	= 1 cd/m^{2}
footlambert	fL	≡ (1/π) cd/ft^{2}	≈ 3.4262590996 cd/m^{2}
lambert	L	≡ (10^{4}/π) cd/m^{2}	≈ 3183.0988618 cd/m^{2}
stilb (CGS unit)	sb	≡ 10^{4} cd/m^{2}	= 10^{4} cd/m^{2}

== Luminous flux ==
Luminous flux
Name of unit	Symbol	Definition	Relation to SI units
lumen (SI unit)	lm	The luminous flux of a source that emits monochromatic radiation of frequency 540×10^{12} hertz and that has a radiant flux of 1/683 watt.	= 1 lm = 1 cd⋅sr

== Illuminance ==
Illuminance
Name of unit	Symbol	Definition	Relation to SI units
footcandle; lumen per square foot	fc	≡ lm/ft^{2}	= 10.763910417 lx
lumen per square inch	lm/in^{2}	≡ lm/in^{2}	≈ 1550.0031 lx
lux (SI unit)	lx	≡ lm/m^{2}	= 1 lx = 1 lm/m^{2}
phot (CGS unit)	ph	≡ lm/cm^{2}	= 10^{4} lx

== Radiation ==
=== Radiation – source activity ===
Radioactivity
Name of unit	Symbol	Definition	Relation to SI units
becquerel (SI unit)	Bq	≡ Number of disintegrations per second	= 1 Bq = 1/s
curie	Ci	≡ 3.7×10^{10} Bq	= 3.7×10^{10} Bq
rutherford (H)	Rd	≡ 1 MBq	= 10^{6} Bq

Although becquerel (Bq) and hertz (Hz) both ultimately refer to the same SI base unit (s^{−1}), Hz is used only for periodic phenomena (i.e. repetitions at regular intervals), and Bq is only used for stochastic processes (i.e. at random intervals) associated with radioactivity.

=== Radiation – exposure ===
Radiation – exposure
Name of unit	Symbol	Definition	Relation to SI units
roentgen	R	1 R ≡ 2.58×10^{−4} C/kg	= 2.58×10^{−4} C/kg

The roentgen is not an SI unit and the NIST strongly discourages its continued use.

=== Radiation – absorbed dose ===
Radiation – absorbed dose
Name of unit	Symbol	Definition	Relation to SI units
gray (SI unit)	Gy	≡ 1 J/kg	= 1 Gy = 1 J/kg = 1 m^{2}⋅s^{2}
rad	rad	≡ 0.01 Gy	= 0.01 Gy

=== Radiation – equivalent dose ===
Radiation – equivalent dose
Name of unit	Symbol	Definition	Relation to SI units
Röntgen equivalent man	rem	≡ 0.01 Sv	= 0.01 Sv
sievert (SI unit)	Sv	≡ 1 J/kg	= 1 Sv = 1 J/kg = 1 m^{2}⋅s^{2}

Although the definitions for sievert (Sv) and gray (Gy) would seem to indicate that they measure the same quantities, this is not the case. The effect of receiving a certain dose of radiation (given as Gy) is variable and depends on many factors, thus a new unit was needed to denote the biological effectiveness of that dose on the body; this is known as the equivalent dose and is shown in Sv. The general relationship between absorbed dose and equivalent dose can be represented as

H = Q ⋅ D

where H is the equivalent dose, D is the absorbed dose, and Q is a dimensionless quality factor. Thus, for any quantity of D measured in Gy, the numerical value for H measured in Sv may be different.
