= Time-variation of fundamental constants =

Hypothetical conflict with the laws of physics as currently known

The term physical constant expresses the notion of a physical quantity subject to experimental measurement which is independent of the time or location of the experiment. The constancy (immutability) of any "physical constant" is thus subject to experimental verification.

Paul Dirac in 1937 speculated that physical constants such as the gravitational constant or the fine-structure constant might be subject to change over time in proportion of the age of the universe. Experiments conducted since then have put upper bounds on their time-dependence. This concerns the fine-structure constant, the gravitational constant and the proton-to-electron mass ratio specifically, for all of which there are ongoing efforts to improve tests on their time-dependence.

The immutability of these fundamental constants is an important cornerstone of the laws of physics as currently known; the postulate of the time-independence of physical laws is tied to that of the conservation of energy (Noether's theorem), so that the discovery of any variation would imply the discovery of a previously unknown law of force.

In a more philosophical context, the conclusion that these quantities are constant raises the question of why they have the specific value they do in what appears to be a "fine-tuned universe", while their being variable would mean that their known values are merely an accident of the current time at which we happen to measure them.

== Dimensionality ==
It is problematic to discuss the proposed rate of change (or lack thereof) of a single dimensional physical constant in isolation. The reason for this is that the choice of a system of units may arbitrarily select any physical constant as its basis, making the question of which constant is undergoing change an artefact of the choice of units.

For example, in SI units, the speed of light has been given a defined value in 1983. Thus, it was meaningful to experimentally measure the speed of light in SI units prior to 1983, but it is not so now. Tests on the immutability of physical constants look at dimensionless quantities, i.e. ratios between quantities of like dimensions, in order to escape this problem. Changes in physical constants are not meaningful if they result in an observationally indistinguishable universe. For example, a "change" in the speed of light c would be meaningless if accompanied by a corresponding "change" in the elementary charge e so that the ratio e^{2}:c (the fine-structure constant) remained unchanged.

Natural units are systems of units entirely based in fundamental constants. In such systems, it is meaningful to measure any specific quantity which is not used in the definition of units. For example, in Stoney units, the elementary charge is set to e = 1 while the reduced Planck constant is subject to measurement, ħ ≈ 137.03, and in Planck units, the reduced Planck constant is set to ħ = 1, while the elementary charge is subject to measurement, e ≈ (137.03)^{1/2}. The 2019 revision of the SI expresses all SI base units in terms of fundamental physical constants, effectively transforming the SI system into a system of natural units.

== Fine-structure constant ==
In 1999, evidence for time variability of the fine-structure constant based on observation of quasars was announced but a much more precise study based on CH molecules did not find any variation. An upper bound of 10^{−17} per year for the time variation, based on laboratory measurements, was published in 2008. Observations of a quasar of the universe at only 0.8 billion years old with an AI analysis method employed on the Very Large Telescope (VLT) found a spatial variation preferred over a no-variation model at the $3.9\sigma$ level.

The time-variation of fine-structure constant is equivalent to the time-variation of one or more of: speed of light, Planck constant, vacuum permittivity, and elementary charge, since $\alpha=\frac{e^2}{2\epsilon_0ch}$.

== Speed of light ==
A variable speed of light (VSL) is a feature of a family of hypotheses stating that the speed of light may in some way not be constant, for example, that it varies with frequency, in space, or over time. Accepted classical theories of physics, and in particular general relativity, predict a constant speed of light in any local frame of reference and in some situations these predict apparent variations of the speed of light depending on frame of reference, but this article does not refer to this as a variable speed of light. Various alternative theories of gravitation and cosmology, many of them non-mainstream, incorporate variations in the local speed of light.

Attempts to incorporate a variable speed of light into physics were made by Robert Dicke in 1957, and by several researchers starting from the late 1980s.

VSL should not be confused with faster than light theories, which depends on a medium's refractive index or its measurement in a remote observer's frame of reference in a gravitational potential. In this context, the "speed of light" refers to the limiting speed c of the theory rather than to the velocity of propagation of photons.

== Gravitational constant ==
The gravitational constant G is difficult to measure with precision, and conflicting measurements in the 2000s have inspired the controversial suggestions of a periodic variation of its value in a 2015 paper. However, while its value is not known to great precision, the possibility of observing type Ia supernovae which happened in the universe's remote past, paired with the assumption that the physics involved in these events is universal, allows for an upper bound of less than 10^{−10} per year for $|\dot G/G|$ over the last nine billion years. The quantity $|\dot G/G|$ is simply the change in time of the gravitational constant, denoted by $\dot G$, divided by G.

As a dimensional quantity, the value of the gravitational constant and its possible variation will depend on the choice of units; in Planck units, for example, its value is fixed at G = 1 by definition. A meaningful test on the time-variation of G would require comparison with a non-gravitational force to obtain a dimensionless quantity, e.g. through the ratio of the gravitational force to the electrostatic force between two electrons, which in turn is related to the dimensionless fine-structure constant.

== Proton-to-electron mass ratio ==
An upper bound of the change in the proton-to-electron mass ratio has been placed at 10^{−7} over a period of 7 billion years (or 10^{−16} per year) in a 2012 study based on the observation of methanol in a distant galaxy.

== Cosmological constant ==
The cosmological constant is a measure of the energy density of the vacuum. It was first measured, and found to have a positive value, in the 1990s. It is currently (as of 2015) estimated at 10^{−122} in Planck units. Possible variations of the cosmological constant over time or space are not amenable to observation, but it has been noted that, in Planck units, its measured value is suggestively close to the reciprocal of the age of the universe squared, Λ ≈ T^{−2}. Barrow and Shaw proposed a modified theory in which Λ is a field evolving in such a way that its value remains Λ ~ T^{−2} throughout the history of the universe.

== See also ==
- Dirac large numbers hypothesis
