= Unit of length =

Reference value of length

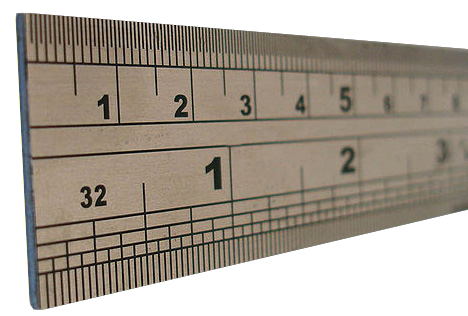
A ruler, depicting two customary units of length, the centimetre (top) and the inch

A unit of length is any arbitrarily chosen and accepted reference standard for measurement of length. The most common units in modern use are the metric units, used in every country globally. In the United States the U.S. customary units are also in use. British Imperial units are still used for some purposes in the United Kingdom and some other countries. The metric system is sub-divided into SI and non-SI units.

== History ==
Before the establishment of the decimal metric system in France during the French Revolution in the late 18th century, many units of length were based on parts of the human body. The Nippur cubit was one of the oldest known units of length. The oldest known metal standard for length corresponds to this Sumerian unit and dates from 2650 BCE. This copper bar was discovered in Nippur, on the banks of the Euphrates, and is kept in the Istanbul Archaeological Museum. Archaeologists consider that this 51.85 centimetres long unit was the origin of the Roman foot. Indeed, the Egyptians divided the Sumerian cubit into 28 fingers and 16 of these fingers gave a Roman foot of 29.633 cm.

== Metric system ==
=== SI ===
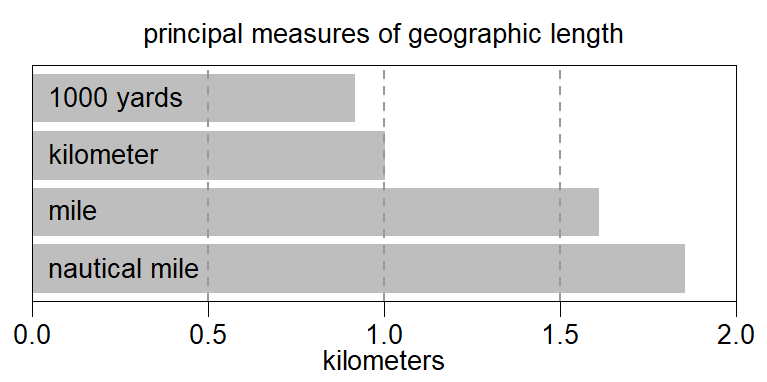
Comparison of four common measures of geographic length.

The base unit in the International System of Units (SI) is the metre, defined as "the length of the path travelled by light in vacuum during a time interval of 1/299792458 seconds." It is approximately equal to 1.0936 yd. Other SI units are derived from the metre by adding prefixes, as in millimetre or kilometre, thus producing systematic decimal multiples and submultiples of the base unit that span many orders of magnitude. For example, a kilometre is 1000 m.

=== Non-SI ===
In the centimetre–gram–second system of units, the basic unit of length is the centimetre, or 1/100 of a metre. Other non-SI units are derived from decimal multiples of the metre.

Name	Symbol	SI value
fermi	fm	1 femtometre
ångström	Å	100 picometres
micron	μm	1 micrometre
Norwegian/Swedish mil or myriametre		10,000 metres
x unit	xu	0.1 picometre

== Imperial/U.S. ==
The basic unit of length in the imperial and U.S. customary systems is the yard, defined as exactly 0.9144 m by international treaty in 1959.

Common imperial units and U.S. customary units of length include:

- thou or mil (1/1000 of an inch)
- inch (25.4 mm)
- foot (12 inches, 0.3048 m)
- yard (3 feet, 0.9144 m)
- (terrestrial) mile (5280 feet, or 1760 yards 1609.344 m)
- (land) league 3 miles (4,800 m)

== Marine ==
In addition, the following are used by sailors:

- fathom (for depth; only in non-metric countries) (2 yards = 1.8288 m)
- nautical mile (one minute of arc of latitude = 1852 m)

== Aviation ==
Air traffic control uses feet for altitude worldwide, except in a minority of countries including Russia, China, North Korea, and many CIS countries. Distance is measured in nautical miles.

== Surveying ==
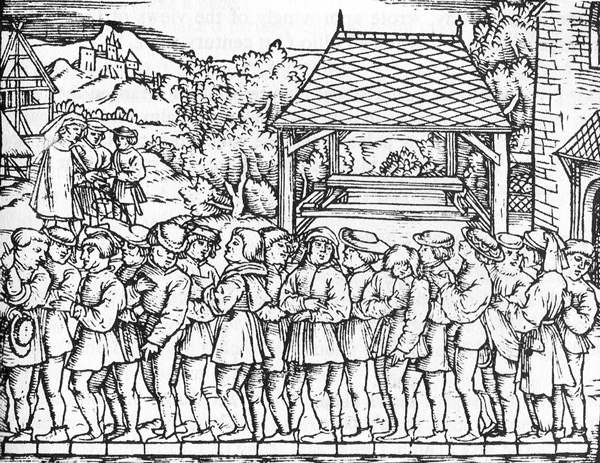
Determination of the rod, using the length of the left foot of 16 randomly chosen people coming from church service

Surveyors in the United States continue to use:

- chain (22 yards, or 20.1168 m)
- rod (also called pole or perch) (quarter of a chain, 5 1/2 yards, or 5.0292 m)

=== Australian building trades ===
The Australian building trades adopted the metric system in 1966 and the units used for measurement of length are metres (m) and millimetres (mm). Centimetres (cm) are avoided as they cause confusion when reading plans. For example, the length two and a half metres is usually recorded as 2500 mm or 2.5 m; it would be considered non-standard to record this length as 250 cm.

=== Surveyor's trade ===
American surveyors use a decimal-based system of measurement devised by Edmund Gunter in 1620. The base unit is Gunter's chain of 66 feet (20 m) which is subdivided into 4 rods, each of 16.5 ft or 100 links of 0.66 feet. A link is abbreviated "lk", and links "lks", in old deeds and land surveys done for the government.

== Science ==
=== Astronomy ===
Astronomical measure uses:

- Earth radius R_{🜨} ≈ 6,371.008 km
- Lunar distance LD ≈ 384402 km. Average distance between the center of Earth and the center of the Moon.
- astronomical unit au. Defined as 149597870700 m. Approximately the distance between the Earth and Sun.
- light-year ly ≈ 9460730472580.8 km. The distance that light travels in a vacuum in one Julian year.
- parsec pc ≈ 30856775814671.9 km or about 3.26156 ly
- Hubble length 14.4 billion light-years or 4.55 gigaparsecs

=== Physics ===
In atomic physics, sub-atomic physics, and cosmology, the preferred unit of length is often related to a chosen fundamental physical constant, or combination thereof. This is often a characteristic radius or wavelength of a particle. Some common natural units of length are included in this table:

Atomic property	Symbol	Length, in metres	Reference
The classical electron radius	r_{e}	2.817940285(31)×10^{−15}	
The Compton wavelength of the electron	λ_{C}	2.426310215(18)×10^{−12}	
The reduced Compton wavelength of the electron	~~λ~~_{C}	3.8615926764(18)×10^{−13}	
The Compton wavelength (or reduced Compton wavelength) of any fundamental particle	~~λ~~_{x}		
The Bohr radius of the hydrogen atom (Atomic unit of length)	a_{0}	5.291772083(19)×10^{−11}	
The reduced wavelength of hydrogen radiation	1 / R_{∞}	9.112670505509(83)×10^{−8}	
The Planck length	𝓁_{P}	1.616199(97)×10^{−35}	
Stoney unit of length	l_{S}	1.381×10^{−35}	
Quantum chromodynamics (QCD) unit of length	l_{QCD}	2.103×10^{−16}	
Natural units based on the electronvolt	1 eV^{−1}	1.97×10^{−7}	

== Archaic ==
Archaic units of distance include:

- cana
- cubit
- rope
- league
- li (China)
- pace (the "double pace" of about 5 feet used in Ancient Rome)
- verst (Russia)

== Informal ==
In everyday conversation, and in informal literature, it is common to see lengths measured in units of objects of which everyone knows the approximate width. Common examples are:

- Double-decker bus (9.5–11 metres in length)
- American football field (100 yards in length)
- Thickness of a human hair (around 80 micrometres)

== Other ==
Horse racing and other equestrian activities keep alive:

- furlong = 1/8 mile (201.168 m)
- horse length ≈ 8 feet (2.4 m)

== See also ==
- List of conversion factors § Length
- List of examples of lengths
- List of unusual units of measurement § Length
- Medieval weights and measures
- Orders of magnitude (length)
- System of measurement
- Units of measurement
