= Siegbahn =

Siegbahn is a surname. Notable people with the surname include:

- Bo Siegbahn (1915–2008), Swedish diplomat
- Kai Siegbahn (1918–2007), Swedish physicist, Nobel Prize in 1981
- Manne Siegbahn (1886–1978), Swedish physicist, Nobel Prize in 1924

== See also ==
- Siegbahn notation, spectroscopic notation for x-ray lines introduced by Manne Siegbahn
- X unit, unit of length defined by Manne Siegbahn
- 10446 Siegbahn, a minor planet named for Kai Siegbahn
