= Nanometre =

Unit of length

nanometre
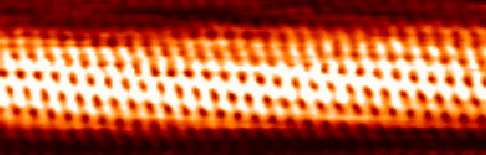
- One nanometric carbon nanotube, visualized using a scanning tunnelling microscope

General information
- Unit system: SI
- Unit of: length
- Symbol: nm

Conversions
1 nm in ...	... is equal to ...
- SI units: 1×10^{−9} m 1×10^{3} pm
- Natural units: 6.1877×10^{25} ℓ_{P} 18.897 a_{0}
- imperial/US units: 3.9370×10^{−8} in

Different lengths as in respect to the electromagnetic spectrum, measured by the metre and its derived scales. The nanometre is often used to express dimensions on an atomic scale and mostly in the molecular scale.

The nanometre (international spelling as used by the International Bureau of Weights and Measures; SI symbol: nm), or nanometer (American spelling), is a unit of length in the International System of Units (SI), equal to one billionth (short scale) or one thousand millionth (long scale) of a metre (0.000000001 m) and to 1000 picometres. One nanometre can be expressed in scientific notation as 1 × 10^{−9} m and as 1/1000000000 m.

== History ==
The nanometre was formerly known as the "millimicrometre" – or, more commonly, the "millimicron" for short – since it is 1/1000 of a micrometre. It was often denoted by the symbol mμ or, more rarely, as μμ (however, μμ should refer to a millionth of a micron).

== Etymology ==
The name combines the SI prefix nano- (from the Ancient Greek νάνος, nanos, "dwarf") with the parent unit name metre (from Greek μέτρον, metron, "unit of measurement").

== Usage ==
Nanotechnologies are based on physical processes which occur on a scale of nanometres (see nanoscopic scale).

The nanometre is often used to express dimensions on an atomic scale: the diameter of a helium atom, for example, is about 0.06 nm, and that of a ribosome is about 20 nm. The nanometre is also commonly used to specify the wavelength of electromagnetic radiation near the visible part of the spectrum: visible light ranges from around 400 to 700 nm. The ångström, which is equal to 0.1 nm, was formerly used for these purposes.

Since the late 1980s, in usages such as the 32 nm and the 22 nm semiconductor node, it has also been used to describe typical feature sizes in successive generations of the ITRS Roadmap for miniaturized semiconductor device fabrication in the semiconductor industry.

== Unicode ==
The CJK Compatibility block in Unicode has the symbol U+339A ㎚ SQUARE NM.
