= Spat (distance unit) =

Obsolete unit of distance in astronomy

The spat (symbol S) is an obsolete unit of distance used in astronomy. It is equal to 1000000000 kilometres (620000000 mi; 6.7 au), or 1 terametre (Tm). A light-year is about 9460 S.
