= Dirac large numbers hypothesis =

Hypothesis relating age of the universe to physical constants

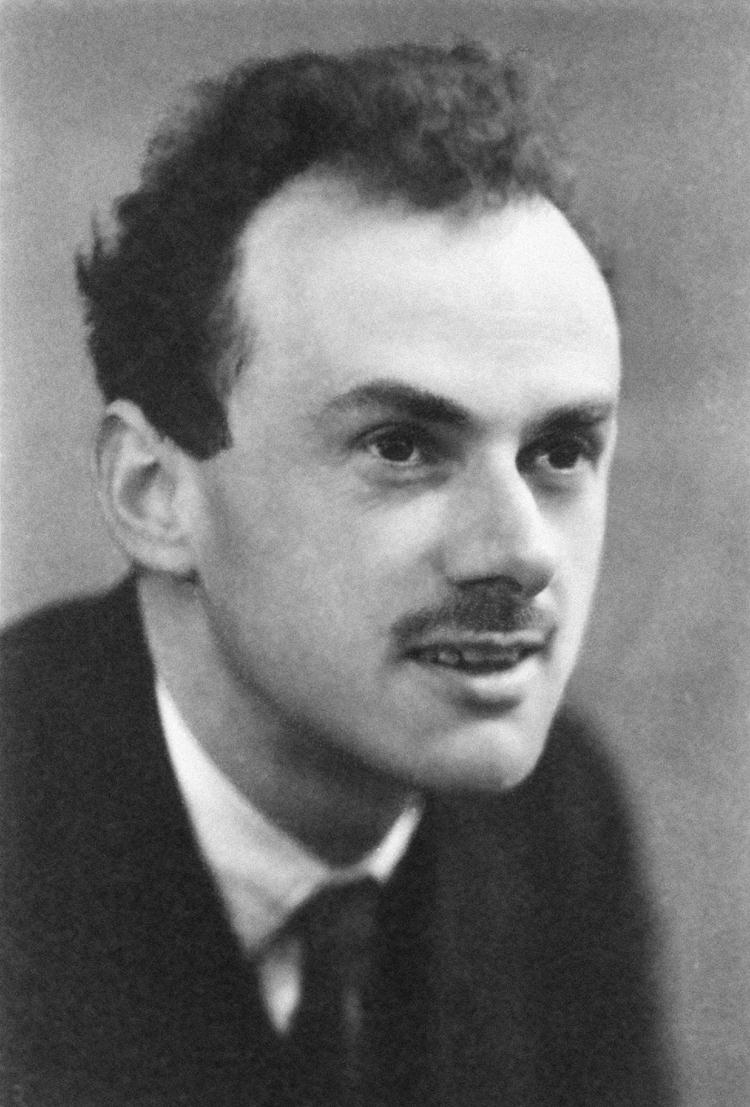
Paul Dirac

The Dirac large numbers hypothesis (LNH) is an observation made by Paul Dirac in 1937 relating ratios of size scales in the Universe to that of force scales. The ratios constitute very large, dimensionless numbers: some 40 orders of magnitude in the present cosmological epoch. According to Dirac's hypothesis, the apparent similarity of these ratios might not be a mere coincidence but instead could imply a cosmology with these unusual features:

- The strength of gravity, as represented by the gravitational constant, is inversely proportional to the age of the universe: $G \propto 1/t\,$
- The mass of the universe is proportional to the square of the universe's age: $M \propto t^2$.
- Physical constants are actually not constant. Their values depend on the age of the Universe.

Stated in another way, the hypothesis states that all very large dimensionless quantities occurring in fundamental physics should be simply related to a single very large number, which Dirac chose to be the age of the universe.

== Background ==
LNH was Dirac's personal response to a set of large number "coincidences" that had intrigued other theorists of his time. The "coincidences" began with Hermann Weyl (1919), who speculated that the observed radius of the universe, R_{U}, might also be the hypothetical radius of a particle whose rest energy is equal to the gravitational self-energy of the electron:

$$\frac {R_\text{U}}{r_\text{e}}\approx \frac{r_\text{H}}{r_\text{e}} \approx 4.1666763 \cdot 10^{42} \approx 10^{42.62\ldots} ,$$

where,

$$r_\text{e} = \frac {e^2}{4 \pi \epsilon_0 \ m_\text{e} c^2} \approx 2.81794032 \cdot 10^{-15} \mathrm{m}$$
$r_\text{H} = \frac {e^2}{4 \pi \epsilon_0 \ m_\text{H} c^2} \approx 1.1741445 \cdot 10^{28} \,\mathrm{m}$ with $m_\text{H} c^2 = \frac {Gm_\text{e}^2}{r_\text{e}}$

and r_{e} is the classical electron radius, m_{e} is the mass of the electron, m_{H} denotes the mass of the hypothetical particle, and r_{H} is its electrostatic radius.

The coincidence was further developed by Arthur Eddington (1931) who related the above ratios to N, the estimated number of charged particles in the universe, with the following ratio:

$$\frac {e^2}{4 \pi \epsilon_0 \ Gm_\text{e}^2} \approx 4.1666763 \cdot 10^{42} \approx \sqrt {N}$$.

In addition to the examples of Weyl and Eddington, Dirac was also influenced by the primeval-atom hypothesis of Georges Lemaître, who lectured on the topic in Cambridge in 1933. The notion of a varying-G cosmology first appears in the work of Edward Arthur Milne a few years before Dirac formulated LNH. Milne was inspired not by large number coincidences but by a dislike of Einstein's general theory of relativity. For Milne, space was not a structured object but simply a system of reference in which relations such as this could accommodate Einstein's conclusions:

$$G = \left(\!\frac{c^3}{M_\text{U}}\!\right)t,$$

where M_{U} is the mass of the universe and t is the age of the universe. According to this relation, G increases over time.

== Dirac's interpretation of the large number coincidences ==
The Weyl and Eddington ratios above can be rephrased in a variety of ways, as for instance in the context of time:

$$\frac {c\,t}{r_\text{e}} \approx 3.47 \cdot 10^{41} \approx 10^{42},$$

where t is the age of the universe, $c$ is the speed of light and r_{e} is the classical electron radius. Hence, in units where c = 1 and r_{e} = 1, the age of the universe is about 10^{40} units of time. This is the same order of magnitude as the ratio of the electrical to the gravitational forces between a proton and an electron:

$$\frac{e^2}{4 \pi \epsilon_0 G m_\text{p} m_\text{e}} \approx 10^{40}.$$

Hence, interpreting the charge $e$ of the electron, the masses $m_\text{p}$ and $m_\text{e}$ of the proton and electron, and the permittivity factor $4 \pi \epsilon_0$ in atomic units (equal to 1), the value of the gravitational constant is approximately 10^{−40}. Dirac interpreted this to mean that $G$ varies with time as $G \approx 1/t$. George Gamow noted that such a temporal variation does not necessarily follow from Dirac's assumptions, and a corresponding change of G has not been found. According to general relativity, G is constant, otherwise the law of conserved energy is violated. Dirac met this difficulty by introducing into the Einstein field equations a gauge function β that describes the structure of spacetime in terms of a ratio of gravitational and electromagnetic units. He also provided alternative scenarios for the continuous creation of matter, one of the other significant issues in LNH:

- 'additive' creation (new matter is created uniformly throughout space) and
- 'multiplicative' creation (new matter is created where there are already concentrations of mass).

== Later developments and interpretations ==
Dirac's theory has inspired and continues to inspire a significant body of scientific literature in a variety of disciplines, with it sparking off many speculations, arguments and new ideas in terms of applications. In the context of geophysics, for instance, Edward Teller seemed to raise a serious objection to LNH in 1948 when he argued that variations in the strength of gravity are not consistent with paleontological data. However, George Gamow demonstrated in 1962 how a simple revision of the parameters (in this case, the age of the Solar System) can invalidate Teller's conclusions. The debate is further complicated by the choice of LNH cosmologies: In 1978, G. Blake argued that paleontological data is consistent with the "multiplicative" scenario but not the "additive" scenario. Arguments both for and against LNH are also made from astrophysical considerations. For example, D. Falik argued that LNH is inconsistent with experimental results for microwave background radiation whereas Canuto and Hsieh argued that it is consistent. One argument that has created significant controversy was put forward by Robert Dicke in 1961. Known as the anthropic coincidence or fine-tuned universe, it simply states that the large numbers in LNH are a necessary coincidence for intelligent beings since they parametrize fusion of hydrogen in stars and hence carbon-based life would not arise otherwise.

Various authors have introduced new sets of numbers into the original "coincidence" considered by Dirac and his contemporaries, thus broadening or even departing from Dirac's own conclusions. Jordan (1947) noted that the mass ratio for a typical star (specifically, a star of the Chandrasekhar mass, itself a constant of nature, approx. 1.44 solar masses) and an electron approximates to 10^{60}, an interesting variation on the 10^{40} and 10^{80} that are typically associated with Dirac and Eddington respectively. (The physics defining the Chandrasekhar mass produces a ratio that is the −3/2 power of the gravitational fine-structure constant (analogous to the electromagnetic fine-structure constant), 10^{−40}.)

=== Modern studies ===
Several authors have recently identified and pondered the significance of yet another large number, approximately 120 orders of magnitude. This is for example the ratio of the theoretical and observational estimates of the energy density of the vacuum, which Nottale (1993) and Matthews (1997) associated in an LNH context with a scaling law for the cosmological constant. Carl Friedrich von Weizsäcker identified 10^{120} with the ratio of the universe's volume to the volume of a typical nucleon bounded by its Compton wavelength, and he identified this ratio with the sum of elementary events or bits of information in the universe. Valev (2019) found an equation connecting cosmological parameters (for example density of the universe) and Planck units (for example Planck density). This ratio of densities, and other ratios (using four fundamental constants: speed of light in vacuum c, Newtonian constant of gravity G, reduced Planck constant ℏ, and Hubble constant H) computes to an exact number, 32.8·10^{120}. This provides evidence of the Dirac large numbers hypothesis by connecting the macro-world and the micro-world.

== See also ==
- Dimensionless physical constant – Physical constant with no units
- Hierarchy problem – Unsolved problem in physics
- Time-variation of fundamental constants – Hypothetical conflict with the laws of physics as currently known
