= X unit =

Unit of length

- Unit of: length
- Symbol: xu

Conversions
| 1 xu in ... | ... is equal to ... |
- SI units: 1.0021×10^{−13} m
- Natural units: 6.2007×10^{21} ℓ_{P} 1.8937×10^{−3} a_{0}
- imperial/US units: 3.9453×10^{−12} in

For the software testing tools, see xUnit.

The x unit (symbol xu) is a unit of length approximately equal to 0.1 pm (10^{−13} m). It is used to quote the wavelength of X-rays and gamma rays.

Originally defined by the Swedish physicist Manne Siegbahn (1886–1978) in 1925, the x unit could not at that time be measured directly; the definition was instead made in terms of the spacing between planes of the calcite crystals used in the measuring apparatus. One x unit was set at 1/3029.04 of the spacing of the (200) planes of calcite at 18 °C.

In modern usage, there are two separate x units, which are defined in terms of the wavelengths of the two most commonly used X-ray lines in X-ray crystallography:

- the copper x unit (symbol xu(Cu Kα_{1})) is defined so that the wavelength of the Kα_{1} line of copper is exactly 1537.400 xu(Cu Kα_{1});
- the molybdenum x unit (symbol xu(Mo Kα_{1})) is defined so that the wavelength of the Kα_{1} line of molybdenum is exactly 707.831 xu(Mo Kα_{1}).

The 2006 CODATA recommended values for these units are:

1 xu(Cu Kα_{1}) = 1.00207699(28)×10^{−13} m,
1 xu(Mo Kα_{1}) = 1.00209955(53)×10^{−13} m.

== See also ==
- Ångström
- Ångström star
