= Kip (unit) =

US customary unit of force

kip
- Unit system: English Engineering Units, British Gravitational System
- Unit of: Force
- Symbol: kip

Conversions
1 kip in ...	... is equal to ...
- SI units: 4.44822 kN
- English Engineering Units: 1000 lbf

A kip is a US customary unit of force. It equals 1000 pounds-force, and is used primarily by structural engineers to indicate forces where the value represented in pound-force is inefficient. Although uncommon, it is occasionally also considered a unit of mass, equal to 1000 pounds (i.e. one half of a short ton). Another use is as a unit of deadweight to compute shipping charges.

1 kip ≈ 4,448.222 N = 4.448222 kN

The name comes from combining the words kilo and pound; it is occasionally called a kilopound. Its symbol is kip, sometimes K (upper or lowercase), or less frequently, klb. When it is necessary to clearly distinguish it as a unit of force rather than mass, it is sometimes called the kip-force (symbol kipf or klbf).

The symbol kp usually stands for the kilopond, a unit of force, or kilogram-force, used primarily in Europe prior to the introduction of SI units.

The kip is also the name of a unit of mass equal to approximately 9.19 kilograms. This usage is obsolete, and was used in Malaysia.

== See also ==
- Short ton-force
