= Elementary charge =

Charge carried by one electron

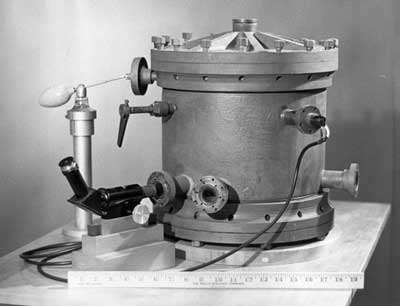
- Robert A. Millikan and Harvey Fletcher's oil drop experiment first directly measured the magnitude of the elementary charge in 1909 (apparatus pictured)
- Common symbols: e
- SI unit: coulomb
- Dimension: $\mathsf{T} \mathsf{I}$
- Value: 1.602176634×10^{−19} C

The elementary charge, usually denoted by e, is the magnitude of the charge on an electron and a fundamental physical constant defined to be exactly e = 1.602176634×10^{−19} C. The elementary charge is a measure of the coupling strength of the electromagnetic force and one of the seven defining constants of the International System of Units (SI).

Before being set to a fixed value as part of the 2019 revision of the SI, the elementary charge was viewed as a quantity to be determined experimentally. Robert A. Millikan and Harvey Fletcher's oil drop experiment first directly measured the magnitude of the elementary charge in 1909, differing from the modern accepted value by just 0.6%. Under assumptions of the then-disputed atomic theory, the elementary charge had also been indirectly inferred to ~3% accuracy from blackbody spectra by Max Planck in 1901 and (through the Faraday constant) at order-of-magnitude accuracy by Johann Loschmidt's measurement of the Avogadro constant in 1865.

== As a unit ==
Elementary charge
- Unit system: atomic units
- Unit of: electric charge
- Symbol: e

Conversions
1 e in ...	... is equal to ...
- coulombs: 1.602176634×10^{−19}
- $\sqrt{\varepsilon_0\hbar c}$ (natural units): 0.30282212088
- statC: ≘ 4.80320425(10)×10^{−10}

In some natural unit systems, such as the system of atomic units, e functions as the unit of electric charge. The use of elementary charge as a unit was promoted by George Johnstone Stoney in 1874 for the first system of natural units, called Stoney units. Later, he proposed the name electron for this unit. At the time, the particle we now call the electron was not yet discovered and the conceptual distinction between the particle electron and the unit of charge electron was still blurred. Later, the name electron was assigned to the particle and the unit of charge e lost its name. However, the unit of energy electronvolt (eV) is a remnant of the fact that the elementary charge was once called electron.

In other natural unit systems, the unit of charge is defined as $\sqrt{\varepsilon_0\hbar c},$ with the result that
$$e = \sqrt{4\pi\alpha}\sqrt{\varepsilon_0 \hbar c} \approx 0.30282212088 \sqrt{\varepsilon_0 \hbar c},$$
where α is the fine-structure constant, c is the speed of light, ε_{0} is the electric constant, and ħ is the reduced Planck constant.

== Quantization ==
All known elementary particles have charges that are integer multiples of the charge on the down quark, an observation known as charge quantization. Thus the charge on the down quark, 1/3 e can be considered the fundamental quantum of charge. However down quarks cannot be isolated: they exist only in combination with other quarks to create particles with a single elementary charge, like protons and neutrons.

The physical cause of charge quantization is not known and it has no explanation in the Standard Model of elementary particles. Grand unification theories predict charge quantization, but they fail in other ways.

=== Fractional elementary charge ===
There are two known types of exception to the indivisibility of the elementary charge: quarks and quasiparticles.

Quarks, first posited in the 1960s, have quantized charge in multiples of $e/3$. However, quarks cannot be isolated; they exist only in groupings, and stable groupings of quarks (such as a proton, which consists of three quarks) all have charges that are integer multiples of e.

Quasiparticles are not particles as such, but rather an emergent entity in a complex material system that behaves like a particle. In 1982 Robert Laughlin explained the fractional quantum Hall effect by postulating the existence of fractionally charged quasiparticles. This theory is now widely accepted, but this is not considered to be a violation of the principle of charge quantization, since quasiparticles are not elementary particles.

=== Lack of fractional charges ===
Paul Dirac argued in 1931 that if magnetic monopoles exist, then electric charge must be quantized; however, it is unknown whether magnetic monopoles actually exist. It is currently not known why isolatable particles are restricted to integer charges; much of the string theory landscape appears to admit fractional charges.

== Experimental measurements of the elementary charge ==
The elementary charge as expressed in SI units is exactly defined since 20 May 2019 by the International System of Units. Prior to this change, the elementary charge was a measured quantity whose magnitude was determined experimentally. This section summarizes these historical experimental measurements.

=== In terms of the Avogadro constant and Faraday constant ===
The first determinations of the elementary charge were based on Faraday's laws of electrolysis. If the Avogadro constant N_{A} and the Faraday constant F are independently known, the value of the elementary charge can be deduced using the formula
$$e = \frac{F}{N_\text{A}}.$$
(In words, the charge of one mole of electrons, divided by the number of electrons in a mole, equals the charge of a single electron.)

In the late 1800s several physicists including Johann Josef Loschmidt and James Clerk Maxwell used estimates of the average diameter of the gas molecules to estimate the Avogadro number, N. Loschmidt's work gave a value of 0.5×10^{23}. Today the value of N_{A} has been adopted as a defining constant equal to 6.02214076×10^{23} mol^{−1}

The value of F could be measured directly using Faraday's laws of electrolysis. Faraday's laws of electrolysis are quantitative relationships based on the electrochemical researches published by Michael Faraday in 1834. In an electrolysis experiment, there is a one-to-one correspondence between the electrons passing through the anode-to-cathode wire and the ions that plate onto or off of the anode or cathode. Measuring the mass change of the anode or cathode, and the total charge passing through the wire (which can be measured as the time-integral of electric current), and also taking into account the molar mass of the ions, one could deduce F.

In 1874, George Johnstone Stoney used this method of Faraday's second law to give the first estimate of the elementary charge; it was too small by a factor of 20. In 1901, Max Planck used his theory of blackbody radiation to estimate the Boltzmann constant, k_{B}, and combined this with a value for the gas constant, R, to estimate N_{A} via
$$R = N_\mathrm{A} k_\mathrm{B},$$
and then applied Faraday's second law. His value of the elementary charge, 4.69×10^{−10} esu, is close to the modern value, 4.80×10^{−10} esu.

=== JJ Thomson's electrostatic measurement ===
In 1898 J J Thomson measured the current in a gas in an electric field exposed to X-rays. The current I would be I = nev, where n is the number of ions measured, e is the charge on the ions, and v their mean velocity. The mean velocity in the electric field was previously measured by Rutherford. Thomson had discovered that water droplets would form around the ions if the gas was saturated before the X-ray exposure. The rate at which the vapor cloud fell gave an estimate of the size of the droplets and the mass of the droplets hitting the bottom of the experimental chamber per unit time gave total flux of water. Combined this gave an estimate of the number of droplets and thus the number of ions, n. Then the current measured could be converted to an estimate of the elementary charge.

=== Oil-drop experiment ===
A famous method for measuring e is Millikan's oil-drop experiment. A small drop of oil in an electric field would move at a rate that balanced the forces of gravity, viscosity (of traveling through the air), and electric force. The forces due to gravity and viscosity could be calculated based on the size and velocity of the oil drop, so electric force could be deduced. Since electric force, in turn, is the product of the electric charge and the known electric field, the electric charge of the oil drop could be accurately computed. By measuring the charges of many different oil drops, it can be seen that the charges are all integer multiples of a single small charge, namely e.

The necessity of measuring the size of the oil droplets can be eliminated by using tiny plastic spheres of a uniform size. The force due to viscosity can be eliminated by adjusting the strength of the electric field so that the sphere hovers motionless.

=== Shot noise ===
Any electric current will be associated with noise from a variety of sources, one of which is shot noise. Shot noise exists because a current is not a smooth continual flow; instead, a current is made up of discrete electrons that pass by one at a time. By carefully analyzing the noise of a current, the charge of an electron can be calculated. This method, first proposed by Walter H. Schottky, can determine a value of e of which the accuracy is limited to a few percent. However, it was used in the first direct observation of Laughlin quasiparticles, implicated in the fractional quantum Hall effect.

=== From the Josephson and von Klitzing constants ===
Another accurate method for measuring the elementary charge is by inferring it from measurements of two effects in quantum mechanics: The Josephson effect, voltage oscillations that arise in certain superconducting structures; and the quantum Hall effect, a quantum effect of electrons at low temperatures, strong magnetic fields, and confinement into two dimensions. The Josephson constant is
$$K_\text{J} = \frac{2e}{h},$$
where h is the Planck constant. It can be measured directly using the Josephson effect.

The von Klitzing constant is
$$R_\text{K} = \frac{h}{e^2}.$$
It can be measured directly using the quantum Hall effect.

From these two constants, the elementary charge can be deduced:
$$e = \frac{2}{R_\text{K} K_\text{J}}.$$

=== CODATA method ===
The relation used by CODATA to determine elementary charge was:
$$e^2 = \frac{2h \alpha}{\mu_0 c} = 2h \alpha \varepsilon_0 c,$$
where h is the Planck constant, α is the fine-structure constant, μ_{0} is the magnetic constant, ε_{0} is the electric constant, and c is the speed of light. Presently this equation reflects a relation between ε_{0} and α, while all others are fixed values. Thus the relative standard uncertainties of both will be same.

=== Tests of the universality of elementary charge ===
Particle	Expected charge	Experimental constraint	Notes
electron	$q_{\text{e}^-}=-e$	exact	by definition
proton	$q_\text{p}=e$	$\left|{q_\text{p} - e}\right| < 10^{-21}e$	by finding no measurable sound when an alternating electric field is applied to SF_{6} gas in a spherical resonator
positron	$q_{\text{e}^+}=e$	$\left|{q_{\text{e}^+} - e}\right| < 10^{-9}e$	by combining the best measured value of the antiproton charge (below) with the low limit placed on antihydrogen's net charge by the ALPHA Collaboration at CERN.
antiproton	$q_{\bar{\text{p}}}=-e$	$\left|{q_{\bar{\text{p}}} + q_\text{p}}\right| < 10^{-9}e$	Hori et al. as cited in antiproton/proton charge difference listing of the Particle Data Group The Particle Data Group article has a link to the current online version of the particle data.

== See also ==
- Committee on Data of the International Science Council
