= Stoney units =

Early system of natural units

In physics, the Stoney units form a system of units named after the Irish physicist George Johnstone Stoney, who first proposed them in 1874 (but published only in 1881). They are the earliest example of natural units, i.e., a coherent set of units of measurement designed so that chosen physical constants fully define and are included in the set.

== Units ==
Quantity	Expression	Value in SI units
Length (L)	$l_\text{S} = \sqrt{\frac{G e^2}{4\pi\epsilon_0 c^4}}$	1.3807×10^{−36} m
Mass (M)	$m_\text{S} = \sqrt{\frac{e^2}{4\pi\epsilon_0 G}}$	1.8592×10^{−9} kg
Time (T)	$t_\text{S} = \sqrt{\frac{G e^2}{4\pi\epsilon_0 c^6}}$	4.6054×10^{−45} s
Electric charge (Q)	$q_\text{S} = ~ e$	1.6022×10^{−19} C

The constants that Stoney used to define his set of units is the following:

- c, the speed of light in vacuum,
- G, the gravitational constant,
- k_{e}, the Coulomb constant,
- e, the charge of the electron.

Later authors typically express the Coulomb constant as 1/4πε_{0}.

This means that the numerical values of all these constants, when expressed in coherent Stoney units, is equal to one:

$$\begin{align}
c &= 1\ l_\text{S} \cdot t_\text{S}^{-1} \\
G &= 1\ l_\text{S}^3 \cdot t_\text{S}^{-2} \cdot m_\text{S}^{-1} \\
k_\text{e} &= 1\ l_\text{S}^3 \cdot t_\text{S}^{-2} \cdot m_\text{S} \cdot q_\text{S}^{-2}\\
e &= 1\ q_\text{S}
\end{align}$$

In Stoney units, the numerical value of the reduced Planck constant is

$$\hbar = \frac{1}{\alpha} ~l_\text{S}^2 \cdot t_\text{S}^{-1} \cdot m_\text{S} \approx 137.036 ~l_\text{S}^2 \cdot t_\text{S}^{-1} \cdot m_\text{S}^{~},$$

where α is the fine-structure constant.

== History ==
George Stoney was one of the first scientists to understand that electric charge was quantized; from this quantization and three other constants that he perceived as being universal (a speed from electromagnetism, and the coefficients in the electrostatic and gravitational force equations) he derived the units that are now named after him. Stoney's derived estimate of the unit of charge, 10^{−20} ampere-second, was 1/16 of the modern value of the charge of the electron due to Stoney using the approximated value of 10^{18} for the number of molecules presented in one cubic millimetre of gas at standard temperature and pressure. Using the modern values for the Avogadro constant 6.02214×10^{23} mol^{−1} and for the volume of a gram-molecule under these conditions of 22.4146×10^{6} mm^{3}, the modern value is 2.687×10^{16}, instead of Stoney's 10^{18}.

== Stoney units and Planck units ==
Stoney's set of base units is similar to the one used in Planck units, proposed independently by Planck thirty years later, in which Planck normalized the Planck constant (Note: In modern usage, Planck units are understood to normalize the reduced Planck constant in place of the Planck constant.) in place of the elementary charge.

Planck units are more commonly used than Stoney units in modern physics, especially for quantum gravity (including string theory). Rarely, Planck units are referred to as Planck–Stoney units.

The Stoney length and the Stoney energy, collectively called the Stoney scale, are not far from the Planck length and the Planck energy, the Planck scale. The Stoney scale and the Planck scale are the length and energy scales at which quantum processes and gravity occur together. At these scales, a unified theory of physics is thus required. The only notable attempt to construct such a theory from the Stoney scale was that of Hermann Weyl, who associated a gravitational unit of charge with the Stoney length and who appears to have inspired Dirac's fascination with the large numbers hypothesis. Since then, the Stoney scale has been largely neglected in the development of modern physics, although it is still occasionally discussed.

The ratio of Stoney units to Planck units of length, time and mass is $\sqrt{\alpha}$, where $\alpha$ is the fine-structure constant: $l_\text{S} = \sqrt{\alpha}\,l_\text{P};$ $m_\text{S} = \sqrt{\alpha}\,m_\text{P};$ $t_\text{S} = \sqrt{\alpha}\,t_\text{P};$ $q_\text{S} = \sqrt{\alpha}\,q_\text{P}.$

== See also ==
- Dimensional analysis
- Natural units
- Physical constants
