= Natural units =

Units of measurement based on universal physical constants

In physics, natural unit systems are measurement systems for which selected physical constants have been set to 1 through nondimensionalization of physical units. For example, the speed of light c may be set to 1, and it may then be omitted, equating mass and energy directly E = m rather than using c as a conversion factor in the typical mass–energy equivalence equation E = mc^{2}. A purely natural system of units has all of its dimensions collapsed, such that the physical constants completely define the system of units and the relevant physical laws contain no conversion constants.

While natural unit systems simplify the form of each equation, it is still necessary to keep track of the non-collapsed dimensions of each quantity or expression in order to reinsert physical constants (such dimensions uniquely determine the full formula).

== Systems of natural units ==
=== Summary table ===
Quantity	Planck	Stoney	Atomic	Particle and atomic physics	Strong	Schrödinger
Defining constants	c, G, ℏ, k_{B}	c, G, e, k_{e}	e, m_{e}, ℏ, k_{e}	c, m_{e}, ℏ, ε_{0}	c, $m_\text{p}$, ℏ	ℏ, G, e, k_{e}
c	1	1	1/α	1	1	1/α
ℏ	1	1/α	1	1	1	1
e	—	1	1	$\sqrt{4 \pi\alpha}$	—	1
ε_{0}	—	1/4π	1/4π	1	—	1/4π
G	1	1	η_{e}/α	η_{e}	η_{p}	1

where:

- α is the fine-structure constant, e^{2} / 4πε_{0}ℏc = 0.0072973525643(11)
- k_{e} is the Coulomb constant, 1 / 4πε_{0} ≈ 8987551786, so assigning it a value also assigns ε_{0} a value.
- η_{e} = Gm_{e}^{2} / ℏc = 10068233135085418604437102.57πGm_{e}^{2} ≈ 1.7518×10^{−45}
- m_{e} is the mass of an electron, 9.1093837139(28)×10^{−31}
- η_{p} = Gm_{p}^{2} / ℏc = 10068233135085418604437102.57πGm_{p}^{2} ≈ 5.9061×10^{−39}
- m_{p} is the mass of a proton, 1.67262192595(52)×10^{−27}
- — indicates where the system is not sufficient to express the quantity.
- k_{B}, the Boltzmann constant, has no interactions with the other constants - it is used only to redefine temperature.

=== Stoney units ===
Stoney system dimensions in SI units
Quantity	Expression	Approx. metric value
Length	$\frac{e\sqrt{G k_\text{e}}}{c^2}$	1.380×10^{−36} m
Mass	$e\sqrt{\frac{k_\text{e}}{G}}$	1.859×10^{−9} kg
Time	$\frac{e\sqrt{G k_\text{e}}}{c^3}$	4.605×10^{−45} s
Electric charge	$e$	1.602×10^{−19} C

The Stoney unit system uses the following defining constants:

c, G, k_{e}, e,

where c is the speed of light, G is the gravitational constant, k_{e} is the Coulomb constant, and e is the elementary charge.

George Johnstone Stoney's unit system preceded that of Planck by 30 years. He presented the idea in a lecture entitled "On the Physical Units of Nature" delivered to the British Association in 1874. Stoney units did not consider the Planck constant, which was discovered only after Stoney's proposal.

=== Planck units ===
Planck dimensions in SI units
Quantity	Expression	Approx. metric value
Length	$\sqrt{\frac{\hbar G}{c^3}}$	1.616×10^{−35} m
Mass	$\sqrt{\frac{\hbar c}{G}}$	2.176×10^{−8} kg
Time	$\sqrt{\frac{\hbar G}{c^5}}$	5.391×10^{−44} s
Temperature	$\frac{\sqrt{\hbar c^5}}{k_\text{B}\sqrt{G}}$	1.417×10^{32} K

The Planck unit system uses the following defining constants:

c, ℏ, G, k_{B},

where c is the speed of light, ℏ is the reduced Planck constant, G is the gravitational constant, and k_{B} is the Boltzmann constant.

Planck units form a system of natural units that is not defined in terms of properties of any prototype, physical object, or even elementary particle. They only refer to the basic structure of the laws of physics: c and G are part of the structure of spacetime in general relativity, and ℏ is at the foundation of quantum mechanics. This makes Planck units particularly convenient and common in theories of quantum gravity, including string theory.

Planck considered only the units based on the universal constants G, h, c, and k_{B} to arrive at natural units for length, time, mass, and temperature, but no electromagnetic units. The Planck system of units is now understood to use the reduced Planck constant, ℏ, in place of the Planck constant, h.

=== Geometrized units ===
The geometrized units system uses the following defining constants:

c, G.

The geometrized unit system, used in general relativity; the base physical units are chosen so that the speed of light, c, and the gravitational constant, G, are set to one.

=== Atomic units ===
Atomic-unit dimensions in SI units
Quantity	Expression	Metric value
Length	$\frac{4 \pi \epsilon_0 \hbar^2}{m_\text{e} e^2}$	5.292×10^{−11} m
Mass	$m_\text{e}$	9.109×10^{−31} kg
Time	$\frac{16\pi^2\epsilon_0^2 \hbar^3}{m_\text{e} e^4}$	2.419×10^{−17} s
Electric charge	$e$	1.602×10^{−19} C

The atomic unit system uses the following defining constants:

m_{e}, e, ħ, 4πε_{0} (this is exactly the same as using k_{e}, except in which constant you use when expressing the conversion).

The atomic units were first proposed by Douglas Hartree and are designed to simplify atomic and molecular physics and chemistry, especially the hydrogen atom. For example, in atomic units, in the Bohr model of the hydrogen atom an electron in the ground state has orbital radius, orbital velocity and so on with particularly simple numeric values.

=== Schrödinger units ===
Schrödinger system dimensions in SI units
Quantity	Expression	Approx. metric value
Length	$\frac{\hbar^2}{e^3}\sqrt{\frac{G}{k_\mathrm{e}^3}}$	2.593×10^{−32} m
Mass	$e\sqrt{\frac{k_\mathrm{e}}{G}}$	1.859×10^{−9} kg
Time	$\frac{\hbar^3}{e^5}\sqrt{\frac{G}{k_\mathrm{e}^5}}$	1.185×10^{−38} s
Electric charge	$e$	1.602×10^{−19} C

The Schrödinger system of units (named after Austrian physicist Erwin Schrödinger) were mentioned by Michael Duff (physicist) in his analysis of fundamental constants. Its defining constants are:

e, ħ, G, k_{e}.

=== Natural units (particle and atomic physics) ===
Particle and Atomic Physics system dimensions in SI units
Quantity	Expression	Metric value
Length	$\frac{\hbar}{m_\text{e} c}$	3.862×10^{−13} m
Mass	$m_\text{e}$	9.109×10^{−31} kg
Time	$\frac{\hbar}{m_\text{e} c^2}$	1.288×10^{−21} s
Electric charge	$\sqrt{\varepsilon_0 \hbar c}$	5.291×10^{−19} C

This natural unit system, used only in the fields of particle and atomic physics, uses the following defining constants:

c, m_{e}, ħ, ε_{0},

where c is the speed of light, m_{e} is the electron mass, ħ is the reduced Planck constant, and ε_{0} is the vacuum permittivity.

The vacuum permittivity ε_{0} is implicitly used as a nondimensionalization constant, as is evident from the physicists' expression for the fine-structure constant, written α = e^{2}/(4π), which may be compared to the corresponding expression in SI: α = e^{2}/(4πε_{0}ħc).

=== Strong units ===
Strong-unit dimensions in SI units
Quantity	Expression	Metric value
Length	$\frac{\hbar}{m_\text{p} c}$	2.103×10^{−16} m
Mass	$m_\text{p}$	1.673×10^{−27} kg
Time	$\frac{\hbar}{m_\text{p} c^2}$	7.015×10^{−25} s

Defining constants:

c, m_{p}, ħ.

Here, m_{p} is the proton rest mass. Strong units are "convenient for work in QCD and nuclear physics, where quantum mechanics and relativity are omnipresent and the proton is an object of central interest".

== See also ==
- Anthropic units
- Astronomical system of units
- Dimensionless physical constant
- International System of Units
- N-body units
- Outline of metrology and measurement
- Unit of measurement
