= Planck units =

Units defined only by physical constants

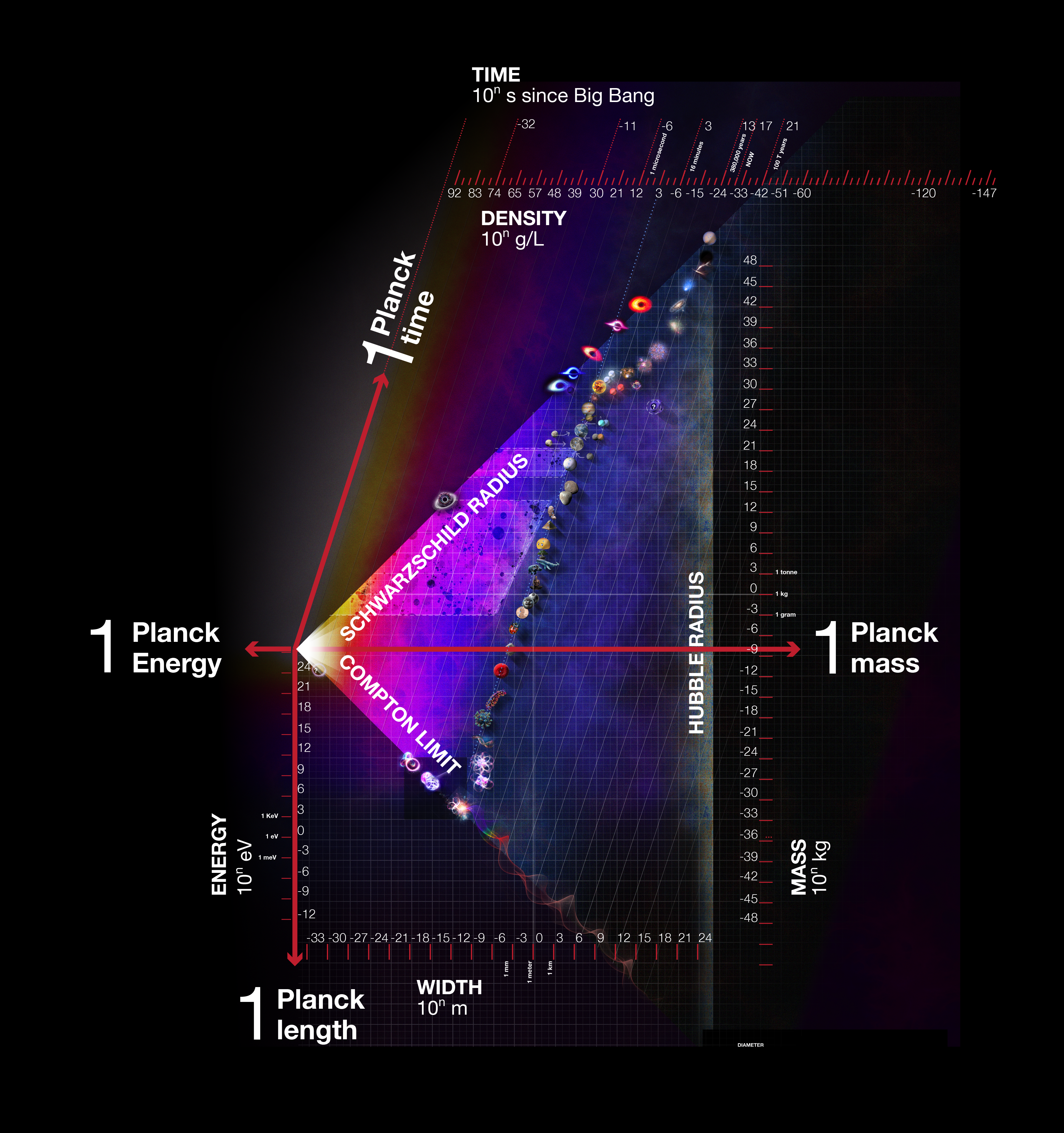
A mass–radius log plot of various objects

In particle physics and physical cosmology, Planck units are a system of units of measurement defined exclusively in terms of four universal physical constants: c (the speed of light in vacuum), G (the gravitational constant), ħ (the reduced Planck constant), and k_{B} (the Boltzmann constant). Expressing one of these physical constants in terms of Planck units yields a numerical value of 1. They are a system of natural units, defined using fundamental properties of nature (specifically, properties of free space) rather than properties of a chosen prototype object. Originally proposed in 1899 by German physicist Max Planck, they are relevant in research on unified theories such as quantum gravity.

The term Planck scale refers to quantities of space, time, energy and other units that are similar in magnitude to corresponding Planck units. This region may be characterized by particle energies of around 10^{19} GeV or 10^{9} J, time intervals of around 10^{−43} s and lengths of around 10^{−35} m (approximately the energy-equivalent of the Planck mass, the Planck time and the Planck length, respectively). At the Planck scale, the predictions of the Standard Model, quantum field theory and general relativity are not expected to apply, and quantum effects of gravity are expected to dominate. One example is represented by the conditions in the first 10^{−43} seconds of our universe after the Big Bang, approximately 13.8 billion years ago.

Variants of the basic idea of Planck units exist, such as alternate choices of normalization that give other numerical values to one or more of the four constants above.

== Introduction ==
Any system of measurement may be assigned a mutually independent set of base quantities and associated base units, from which all other quantities and units may be derived. In the International System of Units, for example, the SI base quantities include length with the associated unit of the metre. In the system of Planck units, a similar set of base quantities and associated units may be selected, in terms of which other quantities and coherent units may be expressed. The Planck unit of length has become known as the Planck length, and the Planck unit of time is known as the Planck time, but this nomenclature has not been established as extending to all quantities.

All Planck units are derived from the dimensional universal physical constants that define the system, and in a convention in which these units are omitted (i.e. treated as having the dimensionless value 1), these constants are then eliminated from equations of physics in which they appear. For example, Newton's law of universal gravitation,

$$F = G \frac{m_1 m_2}{r^2} = \left( \frac{F_\text{P} l_\text{P}^2}{m_\text{P}^2} \right)\frac{m_1 m_2}{r^2},$$

can be expressed as:

$$\frac{F}{F_\text{P}} = \frac{\left(\dfrac{m_1}{m_\text{P}}\right) \left(\dfrac{m_2}{m_\text{P}}\right)}{\left(\dfrac{r}{l_\text{P}}\right)^2}.$$
Both equations are dimensionally consistent and equally valid in any system of units, but the second equation, with G absent, is relating only dimensionless quantities since any ratio of two like-dimensioned quantities is a dimensionless quantity. If, by a shorthand convention, it is understood that each physical quantity is the corresponding ratio with a coherent Planck unit (or "expressed in Planck units"), the ratios above may be expressed simply with the symbols of physical quantity, without being scaled explicitly by their corresponding unit:
$$F' = \frac{m_1' m_2'}{r'^2}.$$
This last equation (without G) is valid with F′, m_{1}′, m_{2}′, and r′ being the dimensionless ratio quantities corresponding to the standard quantities, written e.g. F′ ≘ F or F′ = F/F_{P}, but not as a direct equality of quantities. This may seem to be "setting the constants c, G, etc., to 1" if the correspondence of the quantities is thought of as equality. For this reason, Planck or other natural units should be employed with care. Referring to "G = c = 1", Paul S. Wesson wrote that, "Mathematically it is an acceptable trick which saves labour. Physically it represents a loss of information and can lead to confusion."

== History and definition ==
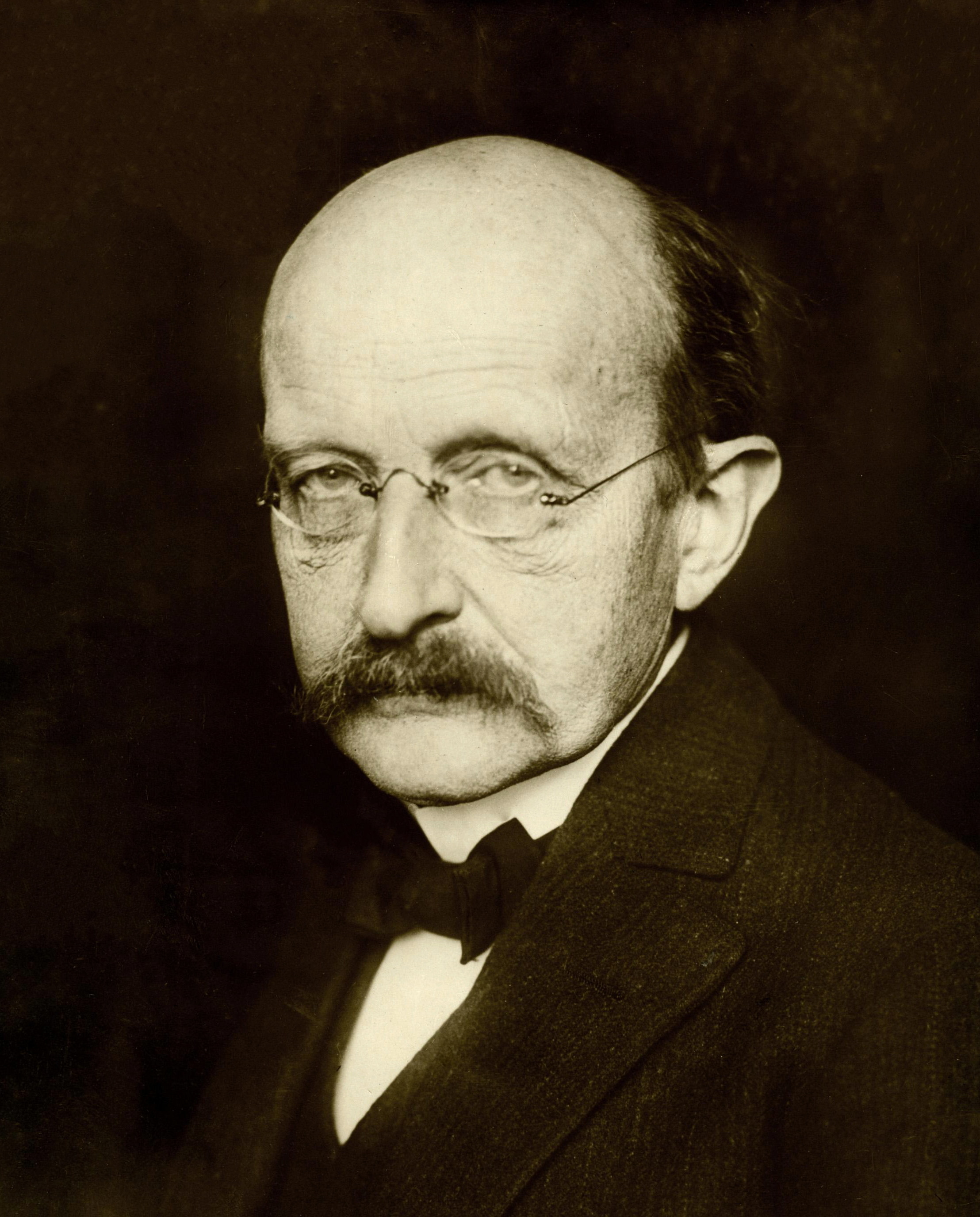
Max Planck in 1933

The concept of natural units was introduced in 1874, when George Johnstone Stoney, noting that electric charge is quantized, derived units of length, time, and mass, later named Stoney units in his honor. Stoney chose his units so that G, c, and the electron charge e would be numerically equal to 1. In 1899, one year before the advent of quantum theory, Max Planck introduced what later became known as the Planck constant. At the end of the paper, he proposed the base units that were later named in his honor. The Planck units are based on the quantum of action, usually called the Planck constant, which appeared in the Wien approximation for black-body radiation. Planck underlined the universality of the new unit system, writing:

... die Möglichkeit gegeben ist, Einheiten für Länge, Masse, Zeit und Temperatur aufzustellen, welche, unabhängig von speciellen Körpern oder Substanzen, ihre Bedeutung für alle Zeiten und für alle, auch ausserirdische und aussermenschliche Culturen nothwendig behalten und welche daher als »natürliche Maasseinheiten« bezeichnet werden können.

[... it is possible to set up units for length, mass, time and temperature, which are independent of special bodies or substances, necessarily retaining their meaning for all times and for all civilizations, including extraterrestrial and non-human ones, which can be called "natural units of measure".]

Planck considered only the units based on the universal constants $G$, $h$, $c$, and $k_\text{B}$ to arrive at natural units for length, time, mass, and temperature. His definitions differ from the modern ones by a factor of $\sqrt{2 \pi}$, because the modern definitions use $\hbar$ rather than $h$.

Table 1: Modern values for Planck's original choice of quantities
Name	Dimension	Expression	Value (SI units)
Planck length	length (L)	$l_\text{P} = \sqrt{\frac{\hbar G}{c^3}}$	1.616255(18)×10^{−35} m
Planck mass	mass (M)	$m_\text{P} = \sqrt{\frac{\hbar c}{G}}$	2.176434(24)×10^{−8} kg
Planck time	time (T)	$t_\text{P} = \sqrt{\frac{\hbar G}{c^5}}$	5.391247(60)×10^{−44} s
Planck temperature	temperature (Θ)	$T_\text{P} = \sqrt{\frac{\hbar c^5}{G k_\text{B}^2}}$	1.416784(16)×10^{32} K

Unlike the case with the International System of Units, there is no official entity that establishes a definition of a Planck unit system. Some authors define the base Planck units to be those of mass, length and time, regarding an additional unit for temperature to be redundant. (Note: For example, both Frank Wilczek and Barton Zwiebach do so, as does the textbook Gravitation.) Other tabulations add, in addition to a unit for temperature, a unit for electric charge, so that either the Coulomb constant $k_\text{e}$ or the vacuum permittivity $\varepsilon_0$ is normalized to 1. Thus, depending on the author's choice, this charge unit is given by
$$q_\text{P} = \sqrt{4\pi\varepsilon_0 \hbar c} = e/\sqrt{\alpha} \approx 1.875546 \times 10^{-18} \text{ C} \approx 11.7 \ e$$
(where $\alpha$ is the fine-structure constant) for $k_\text{e} = 1$, or
$$q'_\text{P} = \sqrt{\varepsilon_0 \hbar c} = e/\sqrt{4\pi\alpha} \approx 5.290818 \times 10^{-19} \text{ C} \approx 3.3 \ e$$
for $\varepsilon_0 = 1$. Some of these tabulations also replace mass with energy when doing so. The former matches the table above in the sense that two particles of this charge and one Planck mass experience balanced electrostatic and gravitational forces, whereas the latter matches with the rationalized Planck units. In SI units, the values of c, h, e and k_{B} are defined and therefore exact while the values of ε_{0} and G in SI units respectively have relative uncertainties of 1.6×10^{−10} and 2.2×10^{−5}. Hence, the uncertainties in the SI values of the Planck units derive almost entirely from uncertainty in the SI value of G.

Compared to Stoney units, Planck base units are all larger by a factor $\sqrt{{1}/{\alpha}} \approx 11.7$.

== Derived units ==
In any system of measurement, units for many physical quantities can be derived from base units. Table 2 offers a sample of derived Planck units, some of which are seldom used.

Table 2: Coherent derived units of Planck units
Derived unit of	Expression	Approximate SI equivalent
area (L^{2})	$l_\text{P}^2 = \frac{\hbar G}{c^3}$	2.6121×10^{−70} m^{2}
volume (L^{3})	$l_\text{P}^3 = \left( \frac{\hbar G}{c^3} \right)^{\frac{3}{2}} = \sqrt{\frac{(\hbar G)^3}{c^9}}$	4.2217×10^{−105} m^{3}
momentum (LMT^{−1})	$m_\text{P} c = \frac{\hbar}{l_\text{P}} = \sqrt{\frac{\hbar c^3}{G}}$	6.5249 kg⋅m/s
energy (L^{2}MT^{−2})	$E_\text{P} = m_\text{P} c^2 = \frac{\hbar}{t_\text{P}} = \sqrt{\frac{\hbar c^5}{G}}$	1.9561×10^{9} J
force (LMT^{−2})	$F_\text{P} = \frac{E_\text{P}}{l_\text{P}} = \frac{\hbar}{l_\text{P} t_\text{P}} = \frac{c^4}{G}$	1.2103×10^{44} N
density (L^{−3}M)	$\rho_\text{P} = \frac{m_\text{P}}{l_\text{P}^3} = \frac{\hbar t_\text{P}}{l_\text{P}^5} = \frac{c^5}{\hbar G^2}$	5.1550×10^{96} kg/m^{3}
acceleration (LT^{−2})	$a_\text{P} = \frac{c}{t_\text{P}} = \sqrt{\frac{c^7}{\hbar G}}$	5.5608×10^{51} m/s^{2}
frequency (T^{−1})	$f_\text{P} = \sqrt{\frac{c^5}{\hbar G}}$	1.8546×10^{43} Hz

Some Planck units, such as of time and length, are many orders of magnitude too large or too small to be of practical use, so that Planck units as a system are typically only relevant to theoretical physics. In some cases, a Planck unit may suggest a limit to a range of a physical quantity where present-day theories of physics apply. For example, our understanding of the Big Bang does not extend to the Planck epoch, i.e., when the universe was less than one Planck time old. Describing the universe during the Planck epoch requires a theory of quantum gravity that would explain both quantum effects and general relativity in their respective domains of applicability. Such a theory does not yet exist.

Several Planck units are not extreme in magnitude. For example, the Planck mass is about 22 micrograms, which is very large compared with subatomic particles, but lies within the mass range of living organisms. Similarly, the units of energy and momentum are in the range of some everyday phenomena.

== Significance ==
Planck units have little anthropocentric arbitrariness, but do still involve some arbitrary choices in terms of the defining constants. Unlike the metre and second, which exist as base units in the SI system for historical reasons, the Planck length and Planck time are conceptually linked at a fundamental physical level. Consequently, natural units help physicists to reframe questions. Frank Wilczek puts it succinctly:

We see that the question [posed] is not, "Why is gravity so feeble?" but rather, "Why is the proton's mass so small?" For in natural (Planck) units, the strength of gravity simply is what it is, a primary quantity, while the proton's mass is the tiny number [1/(13 quintillion)].

While it is true that the electrostatic repulsive force between two protons (alone in free space) greatly exceeds the gravitational attractive force between the same two protons, this is not about the relative strengths of the two fundamental forces.

When Planck proposed his units, the goal was only that of establishing a universal ("natural") way of measuring objects, without giving any special meaning to quantities that measured one single unit. During the 1950s, multiple authors including Lev Landau and Oskar Klein argued that quantities on the order of the Planck scale indicated the limits of the validity of quantum field theory. John Archibald Wheeler proposed in 1955 that quantum fluctuations of spacetime become significant at the Planck scale, though at the time he was unaware of the Planck units.

== Planck scale ==
In particle physics and physical cosmology, the Planck scale is an energy scale around 1.22×10^{28} eV (the Planck energy, corresponding to the energy equivalent of the Planck mass, 2.17645×10^{−8} kg) at which quantum effects of gravity become significant. At this scale, present descriptions and theories of sub-atomic particle interactions in terms of quantum field theory break down and become inadequate, due to the impact of the apparent non-renormalizability of gravity within current theories.

=== Relationship to gravity ===
At the Planck length scale, the strength of gravity is expected to become comparable with the other forces, and it has been theorized that all the fundamental forces are unified at that scale, but the exact mechanism of this unification remains unknown. The Planck scale is therefore the point at which the effects of quantum gravity can no longer be ignored in other fundamental interactions, where current calculations and approaches begin to break down, and a means to take account of its impact is necessary. On these grounds, it has been speculated that it may be an approximate lower limit at which a black hole could be formed by collapse.

While physicists have a fairly good understanding of the other fundamental interactions of forces on the quantum level, gravity is problematic, and cannot be integrated with quantum mechanics at very high energies using the usual framework of quantum field theory. At lower energies it is usually ignored, while for energies approaching or exceeding the Planck scale, a new theory of quantum gravity is necessary. Approaches to this problem include string theory and M-theory, loop quantum gravity, noncommutative geometry, and causal set theory.

=== In cosmology ===
In Big Bang cosmology, the Planck epoch or Planck era is the earliest stage of the Big Bang, before the time passed was equal to the Planck time, t_{P}, or approximately 10^{−43} seconds. There is no currently available physical theory to describe such short times, and it is not clear in what sense the concept of time is meaningful for values smaller than the Planck time. It is generally assumed that quantum effects of gravity dominate physical interactions at this time scale. At this scale, the unified force of the Standard Model is assumed to be unified with gravitation. Immeasurably hot and dense, the state of the Planck epoch was succeeded by the grand unification epoch, where gravitation is separated from the unified force of the Standard Model, in turn followed by the inflationary epoch, which ended after about 10^{−32} seconds (or about 10^{11} t_{P}).

Table 3 lists properties of the observable universe today expressed in Planck units.

Table 3: Today's universe in Planck units
Property of present-day observable universe	Approximate number of Planck units	Equivalents
Age	8.08 × 10^{60} t_{P}	4.35 × 10^{17} s or 1.38 × 10^{10} years
Diameter	5.4 × 10^{61} l_{P}	8.7 × 10^{26} m or 9.2 × 10^{10} light-years
Mass	approx. 10^{60} m_{P}	3 × 10^{52} kg or 1.5 × 10^{22} solar masses (only counting stars); 10^{80} protons (sometimes known as the Eddington number)
Density	1.8 × 10^{−123} m_{P}⋅l_{P}^{−3}	9.9 × 10^{−27} kg⋅m^{−3}
Temperature	1.9 × 10^{−32} T_{P}	2.725 K temperature of the cosmic microwave background radiation
Cosmological constant	≈ 10^{−122} l^{−2}_{P}	≈ 10^{−52} m^{−2}
Hubble constant	≈ 10^{−61} t^{−1}_{P}	≈ 10^{−18} s^{−1} ≈ 10^{2} (km/s)/Mpc

After the measurement of the cosmological constant (Λ) in 1998, estimated at 10^{−122} in Planck units, it was noted that this is suggestively close to the reciprocal of the age of the universe (T) squared. Barrow and Shaw proposed a modified theory in which Λ is a field evolving in such a way that its value remains Λ ~ T^{−2} throughout the history of the universe.

=== Analysis ===
==== Planck length ====
The Planck length is 1.616255×10^{−35} m, about 10^{−20} times the diameter of a proton. It can be interpreted in various ways, such as considering a particle whose reduced Compton wavelength is comparable to its Schwarzschild radius, though whether those concepts are in fact simultaneously applicable is open to debate. (The same heuristic argument simultaneously justifies the Planck mass.)

The Planck length is a distance scale of interest in speculations about quantum gravity. The Bekenstein–Hawking entropy of a black hole is one-fourth the area of its event horizon in units of Planck length squared. Since the 1950s, it has been conjectured that quantum fluctuations of the spacetime metric might make the familiar notion of distance inapplicable below the Planck length. This is sometimes expressed by saying that "spacetime becomes a foam at the Planck scale". It is possible that the Planck length is the shortest physically measurable distance, since any attempt to investigate the possible existence of shorter distances, by performing higher-energy collisions, would result in black hole production. Higher-energy collisions, rather than splitting matter into finer pieces, would simply produce bigger black holes.

The strings of string theory are modeled to be on the order of the Planck length. In theories with large extra dimensions, the Planck length calculated from the observed value of $G$ can be smaller than the true, fundamental Planck length.

==== Planck time ====
Planck time is the time it takes for light to travel a Planck length. One Planck time is 5.39 x 10^{-44} seconds, however the shortest time length measured is 10^{-21} seconds, a zeptosecond.

No current physical theory adequately describes the earliest period of the Big Bang model on the order of the Planck time.

==== Planck energy ====
The Planck energy E_{P} is approximately equal to the energy released in the combustion of the fuel in an automobile fuel tank (57.2 L at 34.2 MJ/L of chemical energy). The ultra-high-energy cosmic ray observed in 1991 had a measured energy of about 50 J, equivalent to about 2.5×10^{−8} E_{P}.

Proposals for theories of doubly special relativity posit that, in addition to the speed of light, an energy scale is also invariant for all inertial observers. Typically, this energy scale is chosen to be the Planck energy.

==== Planck unit of force ====
The Planck unit of force is the gravitational attractive force of two bodies of 1 Planck mass each that are held 1 Planck length apart. One convention for the Planck charge is to choose it so that the electrostatic repulsion of two objects with Planck charge and mass that are held 1 Planck length apart balances the Newtonian attraction between them.

Some authors have argued that the Planck force is on the order of the maximum force that can occur between two bodies. However, the validity of these conjectures has been disputed.

==== Planck temperature ====
At the Planck temperature, the wavelength of light emitted by thermal radiation reaches the Planck length. There are no known physical models able to describe temperatures greater than T_{P}; a quantum theory of gravity would be required to model the extreme energies attained. Hypothetically, a system in thermal equilibrium at the Planck temperature might contain Planck-scale black holes, constantly being formed from thermal radiation and decaying via Hawking evaporation. Adding energy to such a system might decrease its temperature by creating larger black holes, whose Hawking temperature is lower.

== Nondimensionalized equations ==
Physical quantities that have different dimensions (such as time and length) cannot be equated even if they are numerically equal (e.g., 1 second is not the same as 1 metre). In theoretical physics, however, this scruple may be set aside, by a process called nondimensionalization. The effective result is that many fundamental equations of physics, which often include some of the constants used to define Planck units, become equations where these constants are replaced by a 1.

Examples include the energy–momentum relation $E^2 = (mc^2)^2 + (pc)^2$ (which becomes $E^2=m^2+p^2$) and the Dirac equation $(i\hbar \gamma ^{\mu}\partial_{\mu} - mc)\psi = 0$ (which becomes $(i\gamma ^{\mu}\partial_{\mu} - m)\psi = 0$).

== Alternative choices of normalization ==
As already stated above, Planck units are derived by "normalizing" the numerical values of certain fundamental constants to 1. These normalizations are neither the only ones possible nor necessarily the best. Moreover, the choice of what factors to normalize, among the factors appearing in the fundamental equations of physics, is not evident, and the values of the Planck units are sensitive to this choice.

The factor 4π is ubiquitous in theoretical physics because in three-dimensional space, the surface area of a sphere of radius r is 4πr^{2}. This, along with the concept of flux, are the basis for the inverse-square law, Gauss's law, and the divergence operator applied to flux density. For example, gravitational and electrostatic fields produced by point objects have spherical symmetry, and so the electric flux through a sphere of radius r around a point charge will be distributed uniformly over that sphere. From this, it follows that a factor of 4πr^{2} will appear in the denominator of Coulomb's law in rationalized form. (Both the numerical factor and the power of the dependence on r would change if space were higher-dimensional; the correct expressions can be deduced from the geometry of higher-dimensional spheres.) Likewise for Newton's law of universal gravitation: a factor of 4π naturally appears in Poisson's equation when relating the gravitational potential to the distribution of matter.

Hence a substantial body of physical theory developed since Planck's 1899 paper suggests normalizing not G but 4πG (or 8πG) to 1. Doing so would introduce a factor of 1/4π (or 1/8π) into the nondimensionalized form of the law of universal gravitation, consistent with the modern rationalized formulation of Coulomb's law in terms of the vacuum permittivity. In fact, alternative normalizations frequently preserve the factor of 1/4π in the nondimensionalized form of Coulomb's law as well, so that the nondimensionalized Maxwell's equations for electromagnetism and gravitoelectromagnetism both take the same form as those for electromagnetism in SI, which do not have any factors of 4π.

When this is applied to electromagnetic constants, ε_{0}, this unit system is called "rationalized". When applied additionally to gravitation and Planck units, these are called rationalized Planck units and are seen in high-energy physics.

Such rationalized Planck units are defined so that c = 4πG = ħ = ε_{0} = k_{B} = 1. This produces the following set of units:

Expression	Value (SI units)
$l_{\text{P}}^{\prime}=\sqrt{\frac{4\pi G\hbar}{c^{3}}}$	5.7295×10^{−35} m
$m_{\text{P}}^{\prime}=\sqrt{\frac{\hbar c}{4\pi G}}$	6.1396×10^{−9} kg
$t_{\text{P}}^{\prime}=\sqrt{\frac{4\pi G\hbar}{c^{5}}}$	1.9111×10^{−43} s
$q_{\text{P}}^{\prime}=\sqrt{\varepsilon_0 \hbar c}$	5.2908×10^{−19} C
$T_{\text{P}}^{\prime}=\sqrt{\frac{\hbar c^{5}}{4\pi Gk_{\text{B}}^{2}}}$	3.9967×10^{31} K

=== Gravitational constant ===
G nearly always appears in formulae multiplied by 4π or a small integer multiple thereof. Hence, a choice to be made when designing a system of natural units is which, if any, instances of 4π appearing in the equations of physics are to be eliminated via the normalization.

- Normalizing 4πG to 1:
  - Gauss's law for gravity becomes Φ_{g} = −M (rather than Φ_{g} = −4πM in Planck units).
  - Eliminates 4πG from the Poisson equation.
  - Eliminates 4πG in the gravitoelectromagnetic (GEM) equations, which hold in weak gravitational fields or locally flat spacetime. These equations have the same form as Maxwell's equations (and the Lorentz force equation) of electromagnetism, with mass density replacing charge density, and with 1/4πG replacing ε_{0}.
  - Normalizes the characteristic impedance Z_{g} of gravitational radiation in free space to 1 (normally expressed as 4πG/c). (Note: General relativity predicts that gravitational radiation and electromagnetic radiation propagate at the same speed.)
  - Eliminates 4πG from the Bekenstein–Hawking formula (for the entropy of a black hole in terms of its mass m_{BH} and the area of its event horizon A_{BH}) which is simplified to S_{BH} = πA_{BH} = (m_{BH})^{2}.
- Setting 8πG = 1. This would eliminate 8πG from the Einstein field equations, Einstein–Hilbert action, and the Friedmann equations, for gravitation. Planck units modified so that 8πG = 1 are known as reduced Planck units. Also, the Bekenstein–Hawking formula for the entropy of a black hole simplifies to S_{BH} = (m_{BH})^{2}/2 = 2πA_{BH}.

== See also ==
- cGh physics
- Dimensional analysis
- Doubly special relativity
- Trans-Planckian problem
- Zero-point energy
