= Jean-Baptiste Biot =

French physicist (1774–1862)

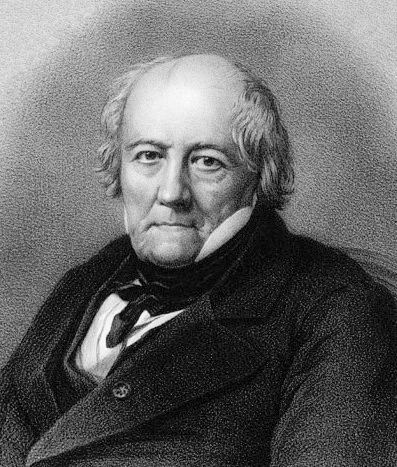
- Jean-Baptiste Biot
- Born: 21 April 1774; Paris, France
- Died: 3 February 1862 (aged 87); Paris, France
- Education: École Polytechnique
- Known for: Biot number Biot–Savart law Circular dichroism Optical rotation
- Awards: Pour le Mérite (1850); Rumford Medal (1840); ForMemRS (1815)
- Scientific career
- Fields: Physics, astronomy and mathematics
- Academic advisors: Gaspard Monge

Jean-Baptiste Biot (/ˈbiːoʊ, ˈbjoʊ/; French: [ʒɑ̃ batist bjo]; 21 April 1774 – 3 February 1862) was a French physicist, astronomer, and mathematician who co-discovered the Biot–Savart law of magnetostatics with Félix Savart, established the reality of meteorites, made an early balloon flight, and studied the polarization of light.

The biot (a CGS unit of electrical current), the mineral biotite, and Cape Biot in eastern Greenland were named in his honour.

== Biography ==
Jean-Baptiste Biot was born in Paris on 21 April 1774 the son of Joseph Biot, a treasury official.

He was educated at Lyceum Louis-le-Grand and École Polytechnique in 1794. Biot served in the artillery before he was appointed professor of mathematics at Beauvais in 1797. He later went on to become a professor of physics at the Collège de France around 1800, and three years later was elected as a member of the French Academy of Sciences. In July 1804, Biot joined Joseph Louis Gay-Lussac for the first scientific hot-air balloon ride to measure how the Earth's magnetic field varies with elevation (NNDB 2009, Reese 2004, O'Connor and Robertson 1997). They reached a height of 4000 metres (13,100 feet) (NNDB 2009, Reese 2004). Later, in Sept. 1804, a solo flight took Gay-Lussac up to 7010 metres (23,000 ft) (quite dangerous without supplementary oxygen (Reese 2004)).

Biot was also a member of the Legion of Honour; he was elected chevalier in 1814 and commander in 1849. In 1815, he was elected a Foreign Member of the Royal Society of London, in 1816 a member of the Royal Swedish Academy of Sciences, and 1822 a Foreign Honorary Member of the American Academy of Arts and Sciences. In addition, Biot received the Rumford Medal in 1840, awarded by the Royal Society in the field of thermal or optical properties of matter. (O’Connor and Robertson 1997). In 1850 Jean-Baptiste Biot published in the Journal des savants a 7-page memoir from his recollections of the period of the late 1790s and early 1800s concerning his encounters with Laplace.

Jean-Baptiste Biot had a single son, Édouard Constant Biot, an engineer and Sinologist, born in 1803. Edouard died in 1850 and his father made extraordinary efforts to ready for publication the second half of Edouard's last book, a reference translation of the Chinese classic Tcheou-li. It had been left in manuscript, unfinished. To publish it in correct form, Jean-Baptiste Biot wrote, he had to consult Stanislas Julien, the famous Sinologist, but also, especially for the translation of the most difficult part, the Kaogongji, he himself visited many workshops and questioned artisans and craftsmen about their methods and vocabulary in order to verify his son's work. Biot's translation remains to this day the only translation into a Western language of this book.

He died in Paris on 3 February 1862.

== Work ==
=== Electromagnetism ===
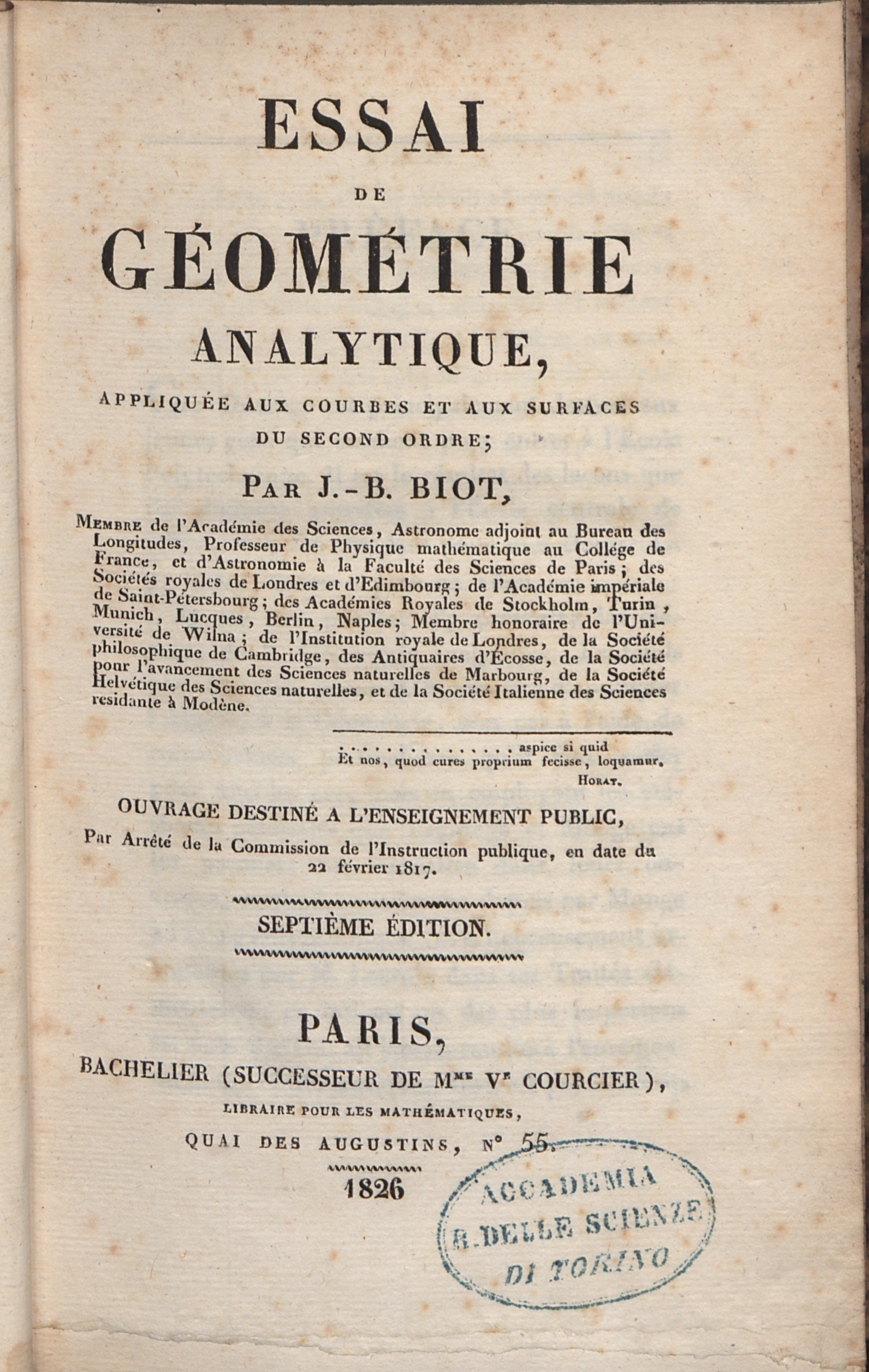
Essai de géométrie analytique, 1826

Jean-Baptiste Biot made many contributions to the scientific community in his lifetime – most notably in optics, magnetism, and astronomy. In 1804, he used lines of equal magnetic field intensity in an article authored together with the Prussian naturalist Alexander von Humboldt. The Biot–Savart law in magnetism is named after Biot and his colleague Félix Savart for their work in 1820. In their experiment they showed a connection between electricity and magnetism by "starting with a long vertical wire and a magnetic needle some horizontal distance apart [and showing] that running a current through the wire caused the needle to move" (Parsley).

=== Meteorites ===
In 1803 Biot was sent by the Académie française to report back on 3000 meteorites that fell on L'Aigle, in Normandy, France (see L'Aigle (meteorite)). He found that the meteorites, called "stones" at the time, were from outer space. With his report, Biot helped support the German physicist Ernst Chladni's argument, published in 1794, that meteorites were debris from space.

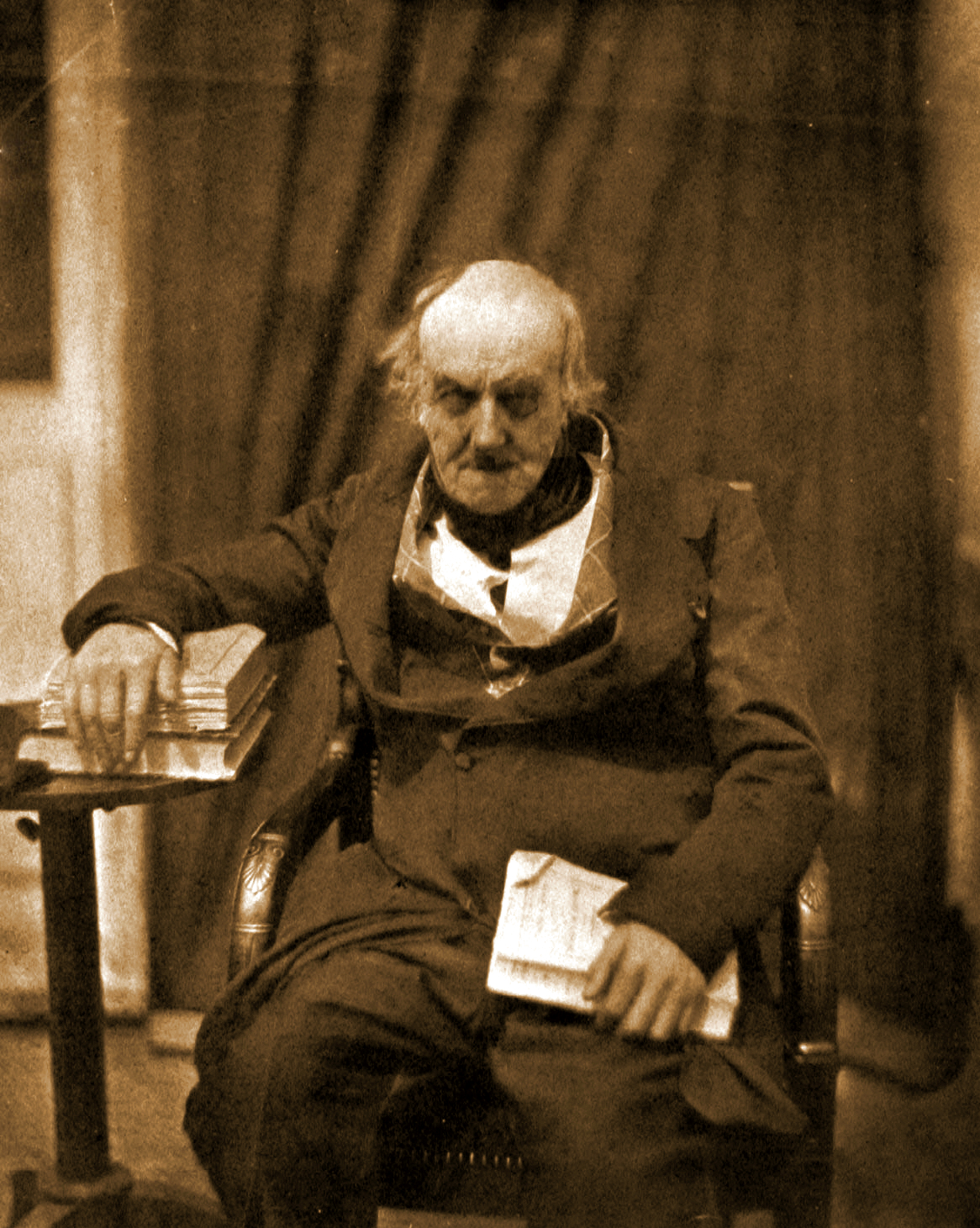
Biot in 1851

Prior to Biot's thorough investigation of the meteorites that fell near l'Aigle, France in 1803, very few truly believed that rocks found on Earth could have extraterrestrial origins. There were anecdotal tales of unusual rocks found on the ground after fireballs had been seen in the sky, but such stories were often dismissed as fantasy. Serious debate concerning the unusual rocks began in 1794 when Ernst Chladni published a book claiming that such rocks had an extraterrestrial origin (Westrum). Only after Biot was able to analyse the rocks at l'Aigle was it commonly accepted that the fireballs seen in the sky were meteors falling through the atmosphere. Since Biot's time, analysis of meteorites has resulted in accurate measurements of the chemical composition of the Solar System. The composition and position of meteors in the Solar System have also given astronomers clues as to how the Solar System formed.

=== Polarized light ===
In 1812, Biot turned his attention to the study of optics, particularly the polarization of light. Prior to the 19th century, light was believed to consist of discrete packets called corpuscles. During the early 19th century, many scientists began to disregard the corpuscular theory in favor of the wave theory of light. Biot began his work on polarization to show that the results he was obtaining could appear only if light were made of corpuscles.

In 1815 he demonstrated that "polarized light, when passing through an organic substance, could be rotated clockwise or counterclockwise, dependent upon the optical axis of the material." His work in chromatic polarization and rotary polarization greatly advanced the field of optics, although it was later shown that his findings could also be obtained using the wave theory of light. The transverse-wave explanation by Augustin-Jean Fresnel is much simpler and is consistent with the equations of James Clerk Maxwell.

Biot's work on the polarization of light has led to many breakthroughs in the field of optics. Liquid crystal displays (LCDs), such as television and computer screens, use light that is polarized by a filter as it enters the liquid crystal, to allow the liquid crystal to modulate the intensity of the transmitted light. This happens as the liquid crystal's polarisation varies in response to an electric control signal applied across it. Polarizing filters are used extensively in photography to cut out unwanted reflections or to enhance reflection.

=== Cream of Tartar ===
Potassium bitartrate was first discovered inside a wine container in Iran. The modern application of the substance began in 1768, and in 1832, Jean Baptiste Biot discovered the physical properties of cream of tartar. The item gained most of its popularity when the French began using it frequently in their cooking.

=== Arc measurement ===
In August 1806, he was commissioned by the Bureau des Longitudes, together with François Arago, to continue the measurement of a meridian arc in France and Spain begun by Delambre and Méchain (the meridian arc of Delambre and Méchain).

== Selected writings ==
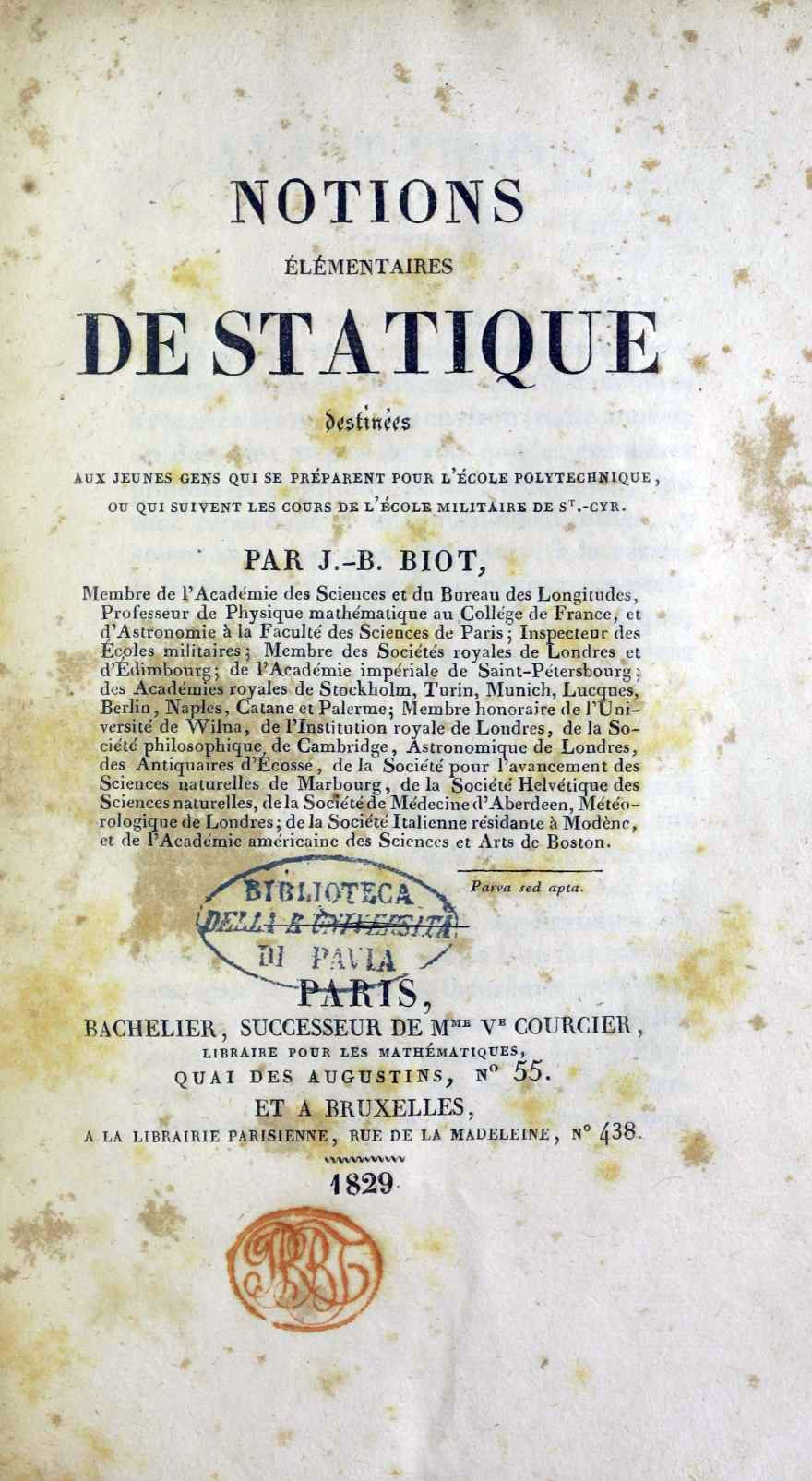
Notions élémentaires de statique, 1829

- Traité élémentaire d'astronomie physique (Klostermann, 1810–1811)
- Récherches expérimentales et mathématiques sur les mouvemens des molécules de la lumière autour de leur centre de gravité (in French). Paris: Firmin Didot. 1814.
- Traité de physique expérimentale et mathématique( Deterville, 1816)
- Précis élémentaire de physique expérimentale (in Italian). Vol. 1. Napoli: Tipografia del Giornale Enciclopedico. 1818.
- Précis élémentaire de physique expérimentale (in Italian). Vol. 2. Napoli: Tipografia del Giornale Enciclopedico. 1818.
- Précis élémentaire de physique expérimentale (in Italian). Vol. 4. Napoli: Tipografia del Giornale Enciclopedico. 1818.
- Précis élémentaire de physique expérimentale (in Italian). Vol. 5. Napoli: Tipografia del Giornale Enciclopedico. 1818.
- Notions élémentaires de statique (in French). Paris: Charles Louis Étienne Bachelier. 1829.
- Précis de l'histoire de l'astronomie planétaire écrit à l'occasion de la découverte de M. Le Verrier (in Italian). Parma: Pietro Fiaccadori. 1854.
- Précis de l'histoire de l'astronomie chinoise (impr. impériale, 1861)
- Études sur l'astronomie indienne et sur l'astronomie chinoise (Lévy frères, 1862)
- Mélanges scientifiques et littéraires (Lévy frères, 1858)
- Recherches sur plusieurs points de l'astronomie égyptienne (Didot, 1823)

== See also ==
- Abampere
- History of the metre
- Seconds pendulum
