= Conversion of units =

Comparison of various scales

Conversion of units is the conversion of the unit of measurement in which a quantity is expressed, typically through a multiplicative factor, called a conversion factor, that changes the unit without changing the quantity. This is also often loosely taken to include replacement of a quantity with a corresponding quantity that describes the same physical property.

Unit conversion is often easier within a metric system such as the SI than in others, due to the system's coherence and its metric prefixes that act as power-of-10 multipliers.

== Overview ==
The definition and choice of units in which to express a quantity may depend on the specific situation and the intended purpose. This may be governed by regulation, contract, technical specifications or other published standards. Engineering judgment may include such factors as:

- the precision and accuracy of measurement and the associated uncertainty of measurement
- the statistical confidence interval or tolerance interval of the initial measurement
- the number of significant figures of the measurement
- the intended use of the measurement, including the engineering tolerances
- historical definitions of the units and their derivatives used in old measurements; e.g., international foot vs. US survey foot.

For some purposes, conversions from one system of units to another need to be exact, without increasing or decreasing the precision of the expressed quantity. An adaptive conversion may not produce an exactly equivalent expression. Nominal values are sometimes allowed and used.

== Factor–label method ==
The factor–label method, also known as the unit–factor method or the unity bracket method, is a widely used technique for unit conversions that uses the rules of algebra.

The factor–label method is the sequential application of conversion factors expressed as fractions and arranged so that any dimensional unit appearing in both the numerator and denominator of any of the fractions can be cancelled out until only the desired set of dimensional units is obtained.

For example, 10 miles per hour can be converted to metres per second by using a sequence of conversion factors as shown below:
$$\frac{\mathrm{10~\cancel{mi}}}{\mathrm{1~\cancel{h}}} \times \frac{\mathrm{1609.344~m}}{\mathrm{1~\cancel{mi}}} \times \frac{\mathrm{1~\cancel{h}}}{\mathrm{3600~s}} = \mathrm{4.4704~\frac{m}{s}}.$$

Each conversion factor is chosen based on the relationship between one of the original units and one of the desired units (or some intermediary unit), before being rearranged to create a factor that cancels out the original unit. For example, as "mile" is the numerator in the original fraction and $\mathrm{1~mi} = \mathrm{1609.344~m}$, "mile" will need to be the denominator in the conversion factor. Dividing both sides of the equation by 1 mile yields $\frac{\mathrm{1~mi} }{\mathrm{1~mi} } = \frac{\mathrm{1609.344~m} }{\mathrm{1~mi} }$, which when simplified results in the dimensionless $1 = \frac{\mathrm{1609.344~m} }{\mathrm{1~mi} }$. Because of the identity property of multiplication, multiplying any quantity (physical or not) by the dimensionless 1 does not change that quantity. Once this and the conversion factor for seconds per hour have been multiplied by the original fraction to cancel out the units mile and hour, 10 miles per hour converts to 4.4704 metres per second.

As a more complex example, the concentration of nitrogen oxides (NO_{x}) in the flue gas from an industrial furnace can be converted to a mass flow rate expressed in grams per hour (g/h) of NO_{x} by using the following information as shown below:

NO_{x} concentration
= 10 parts per million by volume = 10 ppmv = 10 volumes/10^{6} volumes
NO_{x} molar mass
= 46 kg/kmol = 46 g/mol
Flow rate of flue gas
= 20 cubic metres per minute = 20 m^{3}/min
The flue gas exits the furnace at 0 °C temperature and 101.325 kPa absolute pressure.
The molar volume of a gas at 0 °C temperature and 101.325 kPa is 22.414 m^{3}/kmol.

$$\frac{1000\ \ce{g\ NO}_x}{1 \cancel{\ce{kg\ NO}_x}} \times
\frac{46\ \cancel{\ce{kg\ NO}_x}}{1\ \cancel{\ce{kmol\ NO}_x}} \times
\frac{1\ \cancel{\ce{kmol\ NO}_x}}{22.414\ \cancel{\ce{m}^3\ \ce{NO}_x}} \times
\frac{10\ \cancel{\ce{m}^3\ \ce{NO}_x}}{10^6\ \cancel{\ce{m}^3\ \ce{gas}}} \times
\frac{20\ \cancel{\ce{m}^3\ \ce{gas}}}{1\ \cancel{\ce{minute}}} \times
\frac{60\ \cancel{\ce{minute}}}{1\ \ce{hour}} =
24.63\ \frac{\ce{g\ NO}_x}{\ce{hour}}$$

After cancelling any dimensional units that appear both in the numerators and the denominators of the fractions in the above equation, the NO_{x} concentration of 10 ppm_{v} converts to mass flow rate of 24.63 grams per hour.

=== Checking equations that involve dimensions ===
The factor–label method can also be used on any mathematical equation to check whether or not the dimensional units on the left hand side of the equation are the same as the dimensional units on the right hand side of the equation. Having the same units on both sides of an equation does not ensure that the equation is correct, but having different units on the two sides (when expressed in terms of base units) of an equation implies that the equation is wrong.

For example, check the universal gas law equation of PV = nRT, when:

- the pressure P is in pascals (Pa)
- the volume V is in cubic metres (m^{3})
- the amount of substance n is in moles (mol)
- the universal gas constant R is 8.3145 Pa⋅m^{3}/(mol⋅K)
- the temperature T is in kelvins (K)

$$\mathrm{Pa{\cdot}m^3} = \frac{\cancel{\mathrm{mol}}}{1} \times
\frac{\mathrm{Pa{\cdot}m^3}}{\cancel{\mathrm{mol}}\ \cancel{\mathrm{K}}} \times \frac{\cancel{\mathrm{K}}}{1}$$

As can be seen, when the dimensional units appearing in the numerator and denominator of the equation's right hand side are cancelled out, both sides of the equation have the same dimensional units. Dimensional analysis can be used as a tool to construct equations that relate non-associated physico-chemical properties. The equations may reveal undiscovered or overlooked properties of matter, in the form of left-over dimensions – dimensional adjusters – that can then be assigned physical significance. It is important to point out that such 'mathematical manipulation' is neither without prior precedent, nor without considerable scientific significance. Indeed, the Planck constant, a fundamental physical constant, was 'discovered' as a purely mathematical abstraction or representation that built on the Rayleigh–Jeans law for preventing the ultraviolet catastrophe. It was assigned and ascended to its quantum physical significance either in tandem or post mathematical dimensional adjustment – not earlier.

=== Formulation ===
Adopting the ISO 80000-1 notation for the value of physical quantities as the product of a numerical value and a unit:

$$Z = \{Z\}_i \times [Z]_i$$

The same quantity can be expressed in different units $[Z]_j$:

$$Z = \{Z\}_j \times [Z]_j$$

The full value (with units) remains equivalent:

$$\{Z\}_j \times [Z]_j = \{Z\}_i \times [Z]_i$$

But the numerical value differs between the two units:

$$\{Z\}_j = \{Z\}_i \times [Z]_i/[Z]_j$$

The conversion factor is defined as the ratio of the two units:

$$c_{ij} = [Z]_i/[Z]_j$$

The conversion factor is equivalent to a dimensionless quantity $[c]_{ij} = 1$ with a non-unity numerical value $\{c\}_{ij} \neq 1$:

$$c_{ij} = \{c\}_{ij} \times [c]_{ij} = \{c\}_{ij}$$

For example, the conversion factor between seconds and hours is c = 1 h/1 s = 3600 s/s = 3600.

Finally, the conversion factor can be applied to convert the numerical values:

$$\{Z\}_j = \{Z\}_i \times c$$

For example, we have an expression for a physical value Z involving the unit feet per second ($[Z]_i$) and we want it in terms of the unit miles per hour ($[Z]_j$):

1. Find facts relating the original unit to the desired unit:
  1 mile = 5280 feet and 1 hour = 3600 seconds
2. Next use the above equations to construct a fraction that has a value of unity and that contains units such that, when it is multiplied with the original physical value, will cancel the original units:
  $$1 = \frac{1\,\mathrm{mi}}{5280\,\mathrm{ft}}\quad \mathrm{and}\quad 1 = \frac{3600\,\mathrm{s}}{1\,\mathrm{h}}$$
3. Last, multiply the original expression of the physical value by the fraction, called a conversion factor, to obtain the same physical value expressed in terms of a different unit.
  $$52.8\,\frac{\mathrm{ft}}{\mathrm{s}} =
52.8\,\frac{\mathrm{ft}}{\mathrm{s}}
\frac{1\,\mathrm{mi}}{5280\,\mathrm{ft}}
\frac{3600\,\mathrm{s}}{1\,\mathrm{h}} =
\frac {52.8 \times 3600}{5280}\,\mathrm{mi/h}
= 36\,\mathrm{mi/h}$$

Or as an example using the metric system, we have a value of fuel economy in the unit litres per 100 kilometres and we want it in terms of the unit microlitres per metre:

$$\mathrm{\frac{9\,\rm{L}}{100\,\rm{km}}} =
\mathrm{\frac{9\,\rm{L}}{100\,\rm{km}}}
\mathrm{\frac{1000000\,\rm{\mu L}}{1\,\rm{L}}}
\mathrm{\frac{1\,\rm{km}}{1000\,\rm{m}}} =
\frac {9 \times 1000000}{100 \times 1000}\,\mathrm{\mu L/m} =
90\,\mathrm{\mu L/m}$$

== Calculation involving non-SI units ==
In the cases where non-SI units are used, the numerical calculation of a formula can be done by first working out the factor, and then plug in the numerical values of the given/known quantities.

For example, in the study of Bose–Einstein condensate, atomic mass m is usually given in daltons, instead of kilograms, and chemical potential μ is often given in the Boltzmann constant times nanokelvin. The condensate's healing length is given by:
$$\xi=\frac{\hbar}{\sqrt{2m\mu}}\,.$$

For a ^{23}Na condensate with chemical potential of (the Boltzmann constant times) 128 nK, the calculation of healing length (in micrometres) can be done in two steps:

Calculate the factor

Assume that $m=1 \,\text{Da},\mu = k_\text{B}\cdot 1\,\text{nK}$, this gives
$$\xi=\frac{\hbar}{\sqrt{2m\mu}} = 15.574 \,\mathrm{\mu m}\,,$$
which is our factor.

Calculate the numbers

Now, make use of the fact that $\xi\propto\frac{1}{\sqrt{m\mu} }$. With $m=23 \,\text{Da},\mu=128\,k_\text{B}\cdot\text{nK}$, $\xi=\frac{15.574}{\sqrt{23 \cdot 128} } \,\text{μm}=0.287\,\text{μm}$.

This method is especially useful for programming and/or making a worksheet, where input quantities are taking multiple different values; For example, with the factor calculated above, it is very easy to see that the healing length of ^{174}Yb with chemical potential 20.3 nK is

$\xi=\frac{15.574}{\sqrt{174\cdot20.3} } \,\text{μm}=0.262\,\text{μm}$.

== Software tools ==
There are many conversion tools. They are found in the function libraries of applications such as spreadsheets databases, in calculators, and in macro packages and plugins for many other applications such as the mathematical, scientific and technical applications.

There are many standalone applications that offer thousands of the various units with conversions. For example, the free software movement offers a command line utility GNU units for GNU and Windows. The Unified Code for Units of Measure is also a popular option.

== Limitations ==
The factor–label method can convert only unit quantities for which the units are in a linear relationship intersecting at 0 (ratio scale in Stevens's typology). Most conversions fit this paradigm. A case for which it cannot be used is the conversion of scales of temperature, such as between the Celsius scale and the Kelvin scale (or the Fahrenheit scale). Between degrees Celsius and kelvins, there is a constant difference rather than a constant ratio, while between degrees Celsius and degrees Fahrenheit there is neither a constant difference nor a constant ratio. There is, however, an affine transform ($x \mapsto ax+b$, rather than a linear transform $x \mapsto ax$) between them.

For example, the freezing point of water is 0 °C and 32 °F, and a 5 °C change (a 5 K change) is the same as a 9 °F change. Thus, to convert from units of Fahrenheit to units of Celsius, one subtracts 32 °F (the offset from the point of reference), divides by 9 °F and multiplies by 5 °C (scales by the ratio of units), and adds 0 °C (the offset from the point of reference). Reversing this yields the formula for obtaining a quantity in units of Celsius from units of Fahrenheit; one could have started with the equivalence between 100 °C and 212 °F, which yields the same formula.

Hence, to convert the numerical quantity value of a temperature T[F] in degrees Fahrenheit to a numerical quantity value T[C] in degrees Celsius, this formula may be used:

T[C] = (T[F] − 32) × 5/9.

To convert T[C] in degrees Celsius to T[F] in degrees Fahrenheit, this formula may be used:

T[F] = (T[C] × 9/5) + 32.

== See also ==
- Dimensional analysis
- English units
- Imperial units
- International System of Units
- List of conversion factors
- List of metric units
- Mesures usuelles
- Metric prefix
- Metric system
- Metrication
- Natural units
- United States customary units
- Unit of length
- Units of measurement
