= Millimetre =

Unit of length 1/1000 of a metre

millimetre
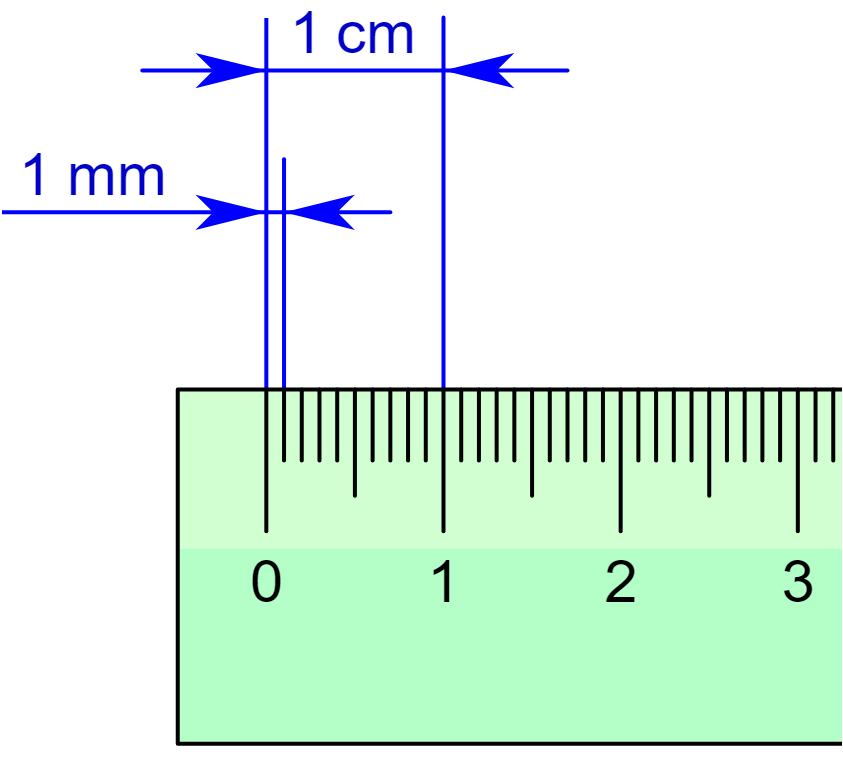
- Ruler with millimetre and centimetre marks

General information
- Unit system: SI
- Unit of: Length
- Symbol: mm
- Named after: From metric prefix mille (Latin for "one thousand") and the metre

Conversions
1 mm in ...	... is equal to ...
- micrometres: 1000
- centimetres: 1/10
- metres: 1/1000
- kilometres: 1/(1 000 000)
- decimetres: 1/100
- inches: 0.039370 in
- feet: 0.0032808 ft

Different lengths with respect to the electromagnetic spectrum. The microwave spans from 1 metre to 1 millimetre.

The millimetre (SI symbol: mm; international spelling) or millimeter (American spelling) is a unit of length in the International System of Units (SI) equal to one thousandth (1/1000 or 10^{−3}) of a metre, the SI base unit for length. It is the smallest unit used in the macroscopic scale.

The conversions between millimetre and other commonly used non-SI metric units are:

- 1 kilometre = 1000000 millimetres
- 1 decimetre = 100 millimetres
- 1 centimetre = 10 millimetres

One millimetre is also equal to:

- 1000 (10^{3}) micrometres
- 1000000 (10^{6}) nanometres
- 10000000 (10^{7}) angstroms
- 1000000000 (10^{9}) picometres
- 1000000000000 (10^{12}) femtometres

The inch, an imperial unit of length used in the United States and still commonly in many Commonwealth countries, is officially defined as exactly 25.4 millimetres, so 1 millimetre is precisely 5/127 inches (≈ 0.03937 inches).

== Definition ==
Since 1983, the metre has been defined as "the length of the path travelled by light in vacuum during a time interval of 1/299792458 of a second", 299792458 being the speed of light measured in metres per second.

A millimetre, being 1/1000 of a metre, is the distance light travels in 1/(299 792 458 000) of a second.

== Informal terminology ==
The term "mil" is sometimes used colloquially for millimetre. However, in the United States, "mil" traditionally means a thousandth of an inch, which may cause confusion.

== Unicode symbols ==
To support layout compatibility with East Asian scripts (CJK), Unicode includes square symbols for:

- Millimetre – U+339C ㎜ SQUARE MM
- Square millimetre – U+339F ㎟ SQUARE MM SQUARED
- Cubic millimetre – U+33A3 ㎣ SQUARE MM CUBED

These symbols are often used in Japanese typography to align unit symbols with text characters.

== Measurement ==
- On a standard metric ruler, the smallest divisions are typically millimetres.
- Precision engineering rulers may show increments of 0.5 mm.
- Digital calipers often measure to 0.01 mm accuracy.

Examples:

- Microwaves with a frequency of 300 GHz have a wavelength of 1 mm.
- Using frequencies from 30–300 GHz for millimetre-wave communications allows high-speed data transfer, such as 10 Gbps.
- The smallest visible object to the human eye is around 0.02–0.04 mm, such as a thin human hair.
- A typical sheet of paper is between 0.07 mm and 0.18 mm thick; copy paper is about 0.1 mm.
- Mechanical pencil leads are commonly produced in 0.5 mm and 0.7 mm sizes.
- Printed circuit boards, automotive components and precision-machined engineering parts are frequently specified using millimetres.

Millimetres are also commonly converted into imperial units such as inches for engineering, manufacturing, construction and international product specifications. One inch is defined as exactly 25.4 millimetres.

Additional metric and imperial conversion references:

- SI Units – NIST
- Millimetres to inches converter
- Inches to millimetres converter
- International System of Units (BIPM)
- Engineering Toolbox

== See also ==
- Metric system
- Orders of magnitude (length)
- Submillimetre astronomy
