= Édouard Biot =

French engineer and sinologist

- Born: July 2, 1803; Paris, France
- Died: March 12, 1850 (aged 46); Paris, France
- Scientific career
- Fields: Engineering, sinology
- Academic advisors: Stanislas Julien

Édouard Constant Biot (French: [bjo]; July 2, 1803 – March 12, 1850) was a French engineer and Sinologist. As an engineer, he participated in the construction of the second line of French railway between Lyon and St Etienne, and as a Sinologist, published a large body of work, the result of a "knowledge rarely combined."

== Life ==
Son of the mathematician and physicist Jean-Baptiste Biot, he studied classics and mathematics as a free student at the Lycée Louis-le-Grand in Paris. Admitted in 1822 to the École Polytechnique, he chose not to enter and pursue his studies alone. In 1825 and 1826, he accompanied his father as an assistant on scientific expeditions to Italy, Illyria and Spain.

Back in France, with desire to ensure his independence, he began a career in the emerging railway industry. In 1827, after a preparatory trip to England, he joined forces with Marc Seguin in the construction of the Lyon–Saint-Etienne railway, whose concession is granted to "MM. Seguin brothers, Édouard Biot and Company. "He worked as an engineer for nearly seven years, using his father's calculations for the levelling of the line.

When this project was completed in 1833, he decided to enjoy the financial independence he had gained to study the Chinese language and literature. He attended courses at the school of Stanislas Julien of the Collège de France and soon began a new career. An extensive series of papers, devoted to astronomy, mathematics, geography, history, social life and administration of China, led to his being elected a Fellow of the Académie des Inscriptions et Belles-Lettres in 1847, having already joined the Asiatic Societies of Paris and London, and several other learned societies. His astronomical translations were later used in particular in associating the Crab Nebula with a supernova observed by the Chinese in 1054.

Married in 1843, he lost his wife in 1846. Unable to overcome his grief, he fell ill and died in Paris four years later at the age of 46.

== Works ==
Biot translated Charles Babbage's On the Economy of Machinery and Manufacture into French, and was the author of one of the earliest works on the railways, the Manuel du constructeur des chemins de fer (Manual of Railway Construction), published in 1834.

Besides his memoirs on Chinese civilization, most of which were published in the Journal Asiatique, he was also the author of a Dictionnaire Géographique de l'Empire Chinois (Geographical Dictionary of the Chinese Empire) and the Histoire de l'Instruction publique en Chine (History of Public Education in China), as well as the translation into French of the Zhou Li or The Rites of Zhou, from the series of books forming the Classic of Rites. This presents a tableau of an idealized political and administrative organization of China in the eleventh century BC. After his death, the publication was completed under the care of his father. Biot's works are still referred to and his translations have not been superseded.

== Publications ==
=== Science and technology ===
- Traité sur l'économie des machines et des manufactures par Charles Babbage, traduit de l'anglais sur la troisième édition par Éd. Biot (1833)
- Manuel du constructeur des chemins de fer, ou Essai sur les principes généraux de l'art de construire les chemins de fer (1834)

=== History ===
- De l'Abolition de l'esclavage ancien en Occident (1840)
- Mémoire sur la condition de la classe servile au Mexique, avant la conquête des Espagnols (1840)

=== Sinology ===
==== Books ====
- Dictionnaire des noms anciens et modernes des villes et arrondissements de premier, deuxième et troisième ordre compris dans l'Empire chinois (1842)
- Essai sur l'histoire de l'instruction publique en Chine et de la corporation des lettrés (2 volumes, 1845-1847)
- Le Tcheou-li ou Rites des Tcheou, traduit pour la première fois du chinois par feu Édouard Biot (2 volumes, 1851). Édité par Jean-Baptiste Biot. Réédition : Ch'eng Wen Publishing Co., Taipei, 1975.

==== Papers ====
- Notice sur quelques procédés industriels connus en Chine au XVIe siècle (1835)
- Mémoire sur la population de la Chine et ses variations, depuis l'an 2400 avant J.-C. jusqu'au XVIIe siècle de notre ère (1836)
- Mémoire sur la condition des esclaves et des serviteurs gagés en Chine (1837)
- Mémoire sur le système monétaire des Chinois (1838)
- Mémoire sur les recensements des terres, consignés dans l'Histoire chinoise (1938)
- Mémoire sur la condition de la propriété territoriale en Chine, depuis les temps anciens (1838)
- Note sur la connaissance que les Chinois ont eue de la valeur de position des chiffres (1839)
- Table générale d'un ouvrage chinois intitulé Souan-fa-tong-tsong, ou Traité complet de l'art de compter (1839)
- Mémoire sur divers minéraux chinois, appartenant à la collection du Jardin du roi (1839)
- Mémoire sur les montagnes et cavernes de la Chine (1840)
- Recherches sur la hauteur de quelques points remarquables du territoire chinois (1840)
- Recherches sur la température ancienne de la Chine. (1840)
- Tchou-chou-ki-nien (1841)
- Traduction et explication du Tchéou-peï (1841)
- Catalogue général des tremblements de terre en Chine (1841)
- Mémoire sur le chapitre Yu-koung du Chou-king et sur la géographie de la Chine ancienne (1842)
- Mémoire sur les déplacements du cours inférieur du fleuve Jaune (1843)
- Recherches sur les mœurs anciennes des Chinois, d'après le Chi-king (1843)
- Observations anciennes de la planète Mercure, extraites de la Collection des vingt-quatre historiens de la Chine (1843)
- Note sur la direction de l'aiguille aimentée en Chine, et sur les aurores boréales observées dans ce pays (1842)
- Mémoire sur l'extension progressive des côtes orientales de la Chine (1844)
- Mémoire sur la Constitution politique de la Chine au XIIe siecle avant notre ère (1844)
- Études sur les anciens temps de l'Histoire chinoise (1845)
- Catalogue de tous les météores observés en Chine, avec la date du jour de l'apparition et l'identification des constellations traversées (1846)
- Recherches faites dans la grande collection des historiens de la Chine, sur les anciennes apparitions de la comète de Halley (1846)
- Catalogue des comètes observées en Chine, depuis l'an 1230 jusqu'à l'an 1640 de notre ère (1846)
- Catalogue des étoiles extraordinaires observées en Chine, depuis les temps anciens jusqu'à l'an 1200 de notre ère (1846)
- Mémoire sur les monuments analogues aux pierres druidiques qu'on rencontre dans l'Asie orientale, et en particulier à la Chine (1848)
- Mémoires sur les colonies militaires et agricoles des Chinois (1850)

=== English translations ===
- The cities and towns of China, a geographical dictionary [by E.C. Biot, revised and tr.] by G.M.H. Playfair (1879)
