= Shake (unit) =

Informal unit of time equal to 10 nanoseconds

shake
- A nuclear fission reaction, which takes about 1 shake.

General information
- Unit system: Nuclear physics
- Unit of: time
- Named after: in two shakes of a lamb's tail

Conversions
1 shake in ...	... is equal to ...
- SI base units: 10^{−8} s
- nanoseconds: 10 ns

A shake is a metric unit of time which is equal to 10 nanoseconds, or 10^{−8} seconds. It was originally coined for use in nuclear physics, helping to conveniently express the timing of various events in a nuclear reaction.

== Etymology ==
Like many units having to do with quantum physics it arose from top secret operations of the Manhattan Project during World War II. The word "shake" was taken from the idiomatic expression "in two shakes of a lamb's tail", which indicates a very short time interval.

The phrase "a couple of shakes", in reference to the measurement of time, may have been popularized by Richard Barham's Ingoldsby Legends (1840); however, the phrase was already part of vernacular language long before that.

== Nuclear physics ==
For nuclear-bomb designers, the term was a convenient name for the short interval, rounded to 10 nanoseconds, which was frequently seen in their measurements and calculations: The typical time required for one step in a chain reaction (i.e. the typical time for each neutron to cause a fission event, which releases more neutrons) is of the order of 1 shake, and a chain reaction is typically complete by 50 to 100 shakes.

== See also ==
- Barn, a companion unit of cross-sectional area created by the same people, for the same general purposes, at the same time (the measured value of nuclear-reaction cross section was larger than expected, hence deemed "as big as a barn").
- List of humorous units of measurement
