= Barn (unit) =

Unit for cross sectional area used in high-energy physics

barn
- Unit of: area
- Symbol: b
- Named after: the broad side of a barn

Conversions
1 b in ...	... is equal to ...
- SI base units: 10^{−28} m^{2}
- square fm: 100 fm^{2}

A barn (symbol: b) is a non-SI metric unit of area equal to 10^{−28} m^{2} (100 fm^{2}). This corresponds to the area of a square with side 10^{−14} m (10 fm) or a circle of diameter approximately 1.128×10^{−14} m (11.28 fm).

Originally used in nuclear physics for expressing the cross sectional area of nuclei and nuclear reactions, today it is also used in all fields of high-energy physics to express the cross sections of any scattering process, and is best understood as a measure of the probability of interaction between small particles. A barn is approximately the cross-sectional area of a uranium nucleus. The barn is also the unit of area used in nuclear quadrupole resonance and nuclear magnetic resonance to quantify the interaction of a nucleus with an electric field gradient. While the barn never was an SI unit, the SI standards body acknowledged it in the 8th SI Brochure (superseded in 2019) due to its use in particle physics.

== Etymology ==
Image of a helium-4 atom; its nucleus has a cross-section of approximately 0.1 barn.

During Manhattan Project research on the atomic bomb during World War II, American physicists Marshall Holloway and Charles P. Baker were working at Purdue University on a project using a particle accelerator to measure the cross sections of certain nuclear reactions. According to an account of theirs from a couple years later, they were dining in a cafeteria in December 1942 and discussing their work. They "lamented" that there was no name for the unit of cross section and challenged themselves to develop one. They initially tried eponyms, names of "some great men closely associated with the field" that they could name the unit after, but struggled to find one that was appropriate. They considered "Oppenheimer" too long (in retrospect, they considered an "Oppy" to perhaps have been allowable), and considered "Bethe" to be too easily confused with the commonly used Greek letter beta. They then considered naming it after John Manley, another scientist associated with their work, but considered "Manley" too long and "John" too closely associated with toilets. But this latter association, combined with the "rural background" of one of the scientists, suggested to them the term "barn", which also worked because the unit was "really as big as a barn". According to the authors, the first published use of the term was in a (secret) Los Alamos report from late June 1943, on which the two originators were co-authors.

== SI prefixes ==
The unit symbol for the barn (b) is also the IEEE standard symbol for bit, and both are commonly used with SI prefixes, which may give rise to ambiguity.

SI multiples of barn (b)
Submultiples			Multiples		
Value	SI symbol	Name	Value	SI symbol	Name
10^{−1} b	db	decibarn	10^{1} b	dab	decabarn
10^{−2} b	cb	centibarn	10^{2} b	hb	hectobarn
10^{−3} b	mb	millibarn	10^{3} b	kb	kilobarn
10^{−6} b	μb	microbarn	10^{6} b	Mb	megabarn
10^{−9} b	nb	nanobarn	10^{9} b	Gb	gigabarn
10^{−12} b	pb	picobarn	10^{12} b	Tb	terabarn
10^{−15} b	fb	femtobarn	10^{15} b	Pb	petabarn
10^{−18} b	ab	attobarn	10^{18} b	Eb	exabarn
10^{−21} b	zb	zeptobarn	10^{21} b	Zb	zettabarn
10^{−24} b	yb	yoctobarn	10^{24} b	Yb	yottabarn
10^{−27} b	rb	rontobarn	10^{27} b	Rb	ronnabarn
10^{−30} b	qb	quectobarn	10^{30} b	Qb	quettabarn

== Conversions ==
Calculated cross sections may be given in terms of inverse squared gigaelectronvolts (GeV^{−2}), via the conversion ħ^{2}c^{2}/GeV^{2} = 0.3894 mb = 38940 am^{2}.

In natural units (where ħ = c = 1), this simplifies to GeV^{−2} = 0.3894 mb = 38940 am^{2}.

barn	GeV^{−2}
1 mb	2.56819 GeV^{−2}
1 pb	2.56819×10^{−9} GeV^{−2}
0.389379 mb	1 GeV^{−2}
0.389379 pb	10^{−9} GeV^{−2}

=== With prefix ===
In the SI, one can use a unit such as the square femtometer (fm^{2}). The most common prefixed form of the barn is the femtobarn, which is equal to a tenth of a square zeptometer. Many scientific papers discussing high-energy physics mention quantities that are a fraction of a femtobarn.

Conversion from SI units
SI	barns
1 pm^{2}	10 kb
1 fm^{2}	10 mb
1 am^{2}	10 nb
1 zm^{2}	10 fb
1 ym^{2}	10 zb
1 rm^{2}	10 rb

Conversion to SI units
Barns	SI	Other names
1 b	100 fm^{2}	
1 cb	1 fm^{2}	
1 mb	0.1 fm^{2} = 100000 am^{2}	
1 μb	100 am^{2}	outhouse
1 nb	0.1 am^{2} = 100000 zm^{2}	
1 pb	100 zm^{2}	
1 fb	0.1 zm^{2} = 100000 ym^{2}	
1 ab	100 ym^{2}	
1 zb	0.1 ym^{2} = 100000 rm^{2}	
1 yb	100 rm^{2}	shed

== Inverse femtobarn ==
The inverse femtobarn (fb^{−1}) is the unit typically used to measure the number of particle collision events per femtobarn of target cross-section, and is the conventional unit for time-integrated luminosity. Thus, if a detector has accumulated 100 fb^{−1} of integrated luminosity, one expects to find 100 events per femtobarn of cross-section within these data.

Consider a particle accelerator where two streams of particles, with cross-sectional areas measured in femtobarns, are directed to collide over a period of time. The total number of collisions will be directly proportional to the luminosity of the collisions measured over this time. Therefore, the collision count can be calculated by multiplying the integrated luminosity by the sum of the cross-section for those collision processes. This count is then expressed as inverse femtobarns for the time period (e.g., 100 fb^{−1} in nine months). Inverse femtobarns are often quoted as an indication of particle collider productivity.

Fermilab produced 10 fb^{−1} in the first decade of the 21st century. Fermilab's Tevatron took about 4 years to reach 1 fb^{−1} in 2005, while two of CERN's LHC experiments, ATLAS and CMS, reached over 5 fb^{−1} of proton–proton data in 2011 alone. In April 2012, the LHC achieved the collision energy of 8 TeV with a luminosity peak of 6760 inverse microbarns per second; by May 2012, the LHC delivered 1 inverse femtobarn of data per week to each detector collaboration. A record of over 23 fb^{−1} was achieved during 2012. As of November 2016, the LHC had achieved 40 fb^{−1} over that year, significantly exceeding the stated goal of 25 fb^{−1}. In total, the second run of the LHC has delivered around 150 fb^{−1} to both ATLAS and CMS in 2015–2018.

=== Usage example ===
As a simplified example, if a beamline runs for 8 hours (28 800 seconds) at an instantaneous luminosity of 300×10^{30} cm^{−2}⋅s^{−1} = 300 μb^{−1}⋅s^{−1}, then it will gather data totaling an integrated luminosity of 8640000 μb^{−1} = 8.64 pb^{−1} = 0.00864 fb^{−1} during this period. If this is multiplied by the cross-section, then a dimensionless number is obtained equal to the number of expected scattering events.

== See also ==
- "Shake", a unit of time created by the same people at the same time as the barn
- Orders of magnitude (area)
- List of unusual units of measurement
- List of humorous units of measurement
