= Abampere =

Unit of electric current

abampere or biot
- Unit system: CGS-EMU
- Unit of: electric current
- Symbol: abA or Bi
- Named after: A.-M. Ampère or J.-B. Biot
- In CGS base units: g^{1/2}⋅cm^{1/2}⋅s^{−1} ^{:25}

Conversions
1 abA in ...	... corresponds to ...
- SI units: 10 amperes^{:25}
- CGS-ESU: c_{cgs} statamperes (Note: The dimensionless constant c_{cgs} = 2.99792458×10^{11} is numerically equal to the magnitude of the speed of light when the latter is expressed in cm/s.) ≈ 2.9979×10^{11} statamperes^{:16}

The abampere (abA), also called the biot (Bi) after Jean-Baptiste Biot, is the derived electromagnetic unit of electric current in the emu-cgs system of units (electromagnetic cgs). One abampere corresponds to ten amperes in the SI system of units. An abampere of current in a circular path of one centimeter radius produces a magnetic field of 2π oersteds at the center of the circle.

The name abampere was introduced by Kennelly in 1903 as a short name for the long name (absolute) electromagnetic cgs unit of current that was in use since the adoption of the cgs system in 1875. The abampere was coherent with the emu-cgs system, in contrast to the ampere, the practical unit of current that had been adopted in 1875.

The emu-cgs (or "electromagnetic cgs") units are one of several systems of electromagnetic units within the centimetre–gram–second system of units; others include esu-cgs, Gaussian units, and Heaviside–Lorentz units. In these other systems, the abampere is not one of the units; the "statcoulomb per second" or statampere is used instead.

The other units in this system related to the abampere are:

- abcoulomb – the charge that passes in one second through any cross section of a conductor carrying a steady current of one abampere
- abhenry – the self-inductance of a circuit or the mutual inductance of two circuits in which the variation of current at the rate of one abampere per second results in an induced electromotive force of one abvolt
- abohm – the resistance of a conductor that, with a constant current of one abampere through it, maintains between its terminals a potential difference of one abvolt

== See also ==
- List of metric units
