= Abvolt =

Unit of voltage

abvolt
- Unit system: CGS-EMU
- Unit of: electric potential, electric potential difference (voltage), and electromotive force
- Symbol: abV
- Named after: Alessandro Volta
- In CGS base units: g^{1/2}·cm^{3/2}/s^{2} ^{:25}

Conversions
| 1 abV in ... | ... corresponds to ... |
- SI derived units: 10^{−8} volt
- CGS-ESU: 1/c_{cgs} statvolt (Note: The dimensionless constant c_{cgs} = 2.99792458×10^{10} is numerically equal to the magnitude of the speed of light when the latter is expressed in cm/s.)

The abvolt (abV) is the unit of potential difference in the CGS-EMU system of units. It corresponds to 1/c_{cgs} statvolt ≈ 3.3356×10^{−11} statvolt in the CGS-ESU system.

Before the 2019 revision of the SI the Abvolt corresponded to exactly 10^{−8} volt in the SI system. In 2019 the definition of the ampere was changed, and this relationship is very close to true, but no longer exact.

A potential difference of 1 abV will drive a current of one abampere through a resistance of one abohm.

In most practical applications, the volt and its multiples are preferred. The national standard in the United States deprecates the use of the abvolt, suggesting the use of volts instead.

The name abvolt was introduced by Kennelly in 1903 as a short name for the long name (absolute) electromagnetic cgs unit of e.m.f. that was in use since the adoption of the cgs system in 1875. The abvolt was coherent with the CGS-EMU system, in contrast to the volt, the practical unit of e.m.f. that had been adopted too in 1875.
