= Kilowatt-hour =

Unit of energy, often used for electrical billing

kilowatt-hour
- Residential electricity meter located in Canada

General information
- Unit system: Non-SI metric
- Unit of: Energy
- Symbol: kW⋅h, kW h

Conversions
1 kW⋅h in ...	... is equal to ...
- SI units: 3.6 MJ
- CGS units: 3.6×10^{13} erg
- Imperial units: ≈ 85,429,300 ft⋅pdl
- English Engineering units (US only): ≈ 2,655,224 ft⋅lbf

A kilowatt-hour (unit symbol: kW⋅h or kW h; commonly written as kWh) is a non-SI unit of energy equal to 3.6 megajoules (MJ) in SI units, which is the energy delivered by one kilowatt of power for one hour.

Kilowatt-hours are a common billing unit for electrical energy supplied by electric utilities. Metric prefixes are used for multiples and submultiples of the basic unit, the watt-hour.

== Definition ==
The kilowatt-hour is a composite unit of energy equal to one kilowatt (kW) multiplied by (i.e., sustained for) one hour. The International System of Units (SI) unit of energy is the joule (symbol J). Because a watt is by definition one joule per second, and because there are 3,600 seconds in an hour, one kWh equals 3,600 kilojoules or 3.6 MJ.

== Unit representations ==
A widely used symbol for the kilowatt-hour is kWh, obtained by compounding the symbols kW (for kilowatt) and h (for hour). This unit (and symbol) is commonly used in billing for delivered energy to consumers by electric utility companies, and in commercial, educational, and scientific publications, and in the media. It is also the usual unit representation in electrical power engineering. This common representation, however, does not comply with the style guide of the International System of Units (SI).

Other representations of the unit may be encountered:

- kW⋅h and kW h are less commonly used, but they are consistent with the SI. The SI brochure states that in forming a compound unit symbol, "Multiplication must be indicated by a space or a half-high (centred) dot (⋅), since otherwise some prefixes could be misinterpreted as a unit symbol." This is supported by a standard issued jointly by an international (IEEE) and national (ASTM) organization, and by a major style guide. However, the IEEE/ASTM standard allows kWh (but does not mention other multiples of the watt-hour). One guide published by NIST specifically recommends against kWh "to avoid possible confusion".
- In 2014, the United States official fuel-economy window sticker for electric vehicles used the abbreviation kW-hrs.
- Variations in capitalization are sometimes encountered: KWh, KWH, kwh, etc., which are inconsistent with the International System of Units.
- The notation kW/h for the kilowatt-hour is incorrect, as it denotes kilowatt per hour.

The hour is a unit of time listed among the non-SI units accepted by the International Bureau of Weights and Measures for use with the SI.

An electric heater consuming 1,000 watts (1 kilowatt) operating for one hour uses one kilowatt-hour of energy, as does a television consuming 100 watts operating continuously for 10 hours or a 40-watt electric appliance operating continuously for 25 hours.

== Electricity sales ==
Electrical energy is typically sold to consumers in kilowatt-hours. The cost of running an electrical device with a constant power consumption rate is calculated by multiplying the device's power consumption in kilowatts by the operating time in hours, and by the price per kilowatt-hour (numerical integration is needed when the power consumption is not constant over the time period). The unit price of electricity charged by utility companies may depend on the customer's consumption profile over time. Prices vary considerably by locality. In the United States, prices in different states can vary by a factor of three.

While smaller customer loads are usually billed only for energy, transmission services, and the rated capacity, larger consumers also pay for peak power consumption, the greatest power recorded in a fairly short time, such as 15 minutes. This compensates the power company for maintaining the infrastructure needed to provide peak power. These charges are billed as demand changes. Industrial users may also have extra charges according to the power factor of their load.

Major energy production or consumption is often expressed as terawatt-hours (TWh) for a given period, often a calendar year or financial year. A 365-day year equals 8,760 hours, so one gigawatt sustained over a year corresponds to 8.76 terawatt-hours of energy. Conversely, one terawatt-hour is equal to the sustained power of about 114 megawatts for a period of one year.

== Examples ==
In 2020, the average household in the United States consumed 893 kWh per month, corresponding to an ongoing average power consumption per household of 1.22 kW.

Raising the temperature of 1 litre of water from room temperature to the boiling point with an electric kettle takes about 0.1 kWh.

A 12-watt LED lamp lit constantly uses about 0.3 kWh per 24 hours and about 9 kWh per month.

In terms of human power, a healthy adult male manual laborer performs work equal to about half a kilowatt-hour over an eight-hour day.

== Conversions ==
To convert a quantity measured in a unit in the left column to the units in the top row, multiply by the factor in the cell where the row and column intersect.

	Joule	Watt-hour	Kilowatt-hour	Electronvolt	Calorie
1 J = 1 kg⋅m^{2}⋅s^{−2} =	1	2.77778 × 10^{−4}	2.77778 × 10^{−7}	6.241 × 10^{18}	0.239
1 Wh =	3.6 × 10^{3}	1	0.001	2.247 × 10^{22}	859.8
1 kWh =	3.6 × 10^{6}	1,000	1	2.247 × 10^{25}	8.598 × 10^{5}
1 eV =	1.602 × 10^{−19}	4.45 × 10^{−23}	4.45 × 10^{−26}	1	3.827 × 10^{−20}
1 cal =	4.184	1.162 × 10^{−3}	1.162 × 10^{−6}	2.612 × 10^{19}	1

== Watt-hour multiples ==
SI multiples of watt-hour (W⋅h)
Value	Symbol	Name
10^{−6}	μW⋅h	microwatt-hour
10^{−3}	mW⋅h	milliwatt-hour
10^{0}	W⋅h	watt-hour
10^{3}	kW⋅h	kilowatt-hour
10^{6}	MW⋅h	megawatt-hour
10^{9}	GW⋅h	gigawatt-hour
10^{12}	TW⋅h	terawatt-hour
10^{15}	PW⋅h	petawatt-hour

SI prefixes are commonly applied to the watt-hour: a kilowatt-hour (kWh) is 1,000 Wh; a megawatt-hour (MWh) is 1 million Wh and so on. The kilowatt-hour is commonly used by electrical energy providers for purposes of billing, since the monthly energy consumption of a typical residential customer ranges from a few hundred to a few thousand kilowatt-hours. Megawatt-hours (MWh), gigawatt-hours (GWh), and terawatt-hours (TWh) are often used for metering larger amounts of electrical energy to industrial customers and in power generation. The terawatt-hour and petawatt-hour (PWh) units are large enough to conveniently express the annual electricity generation for whole countries and the world energy consumption.

== Distinction between kWh (energy) and kW (power) ==
A kilowatt is a unit of power (rate of flow of energy per unit of time). A kilowatt-hour is a unit of energy. Kilowatt per hour would be a rate of change of power flow with time.

Work is the amount of energy transferred to a system; power is the rate of delivery of energy. Energy is measured in joules, or watt-seconds. Power is measured in watts, or joules per second.

For example, a battery stores energy. When the battery delivers its energy, it does so at a certain power, that is, the rate of delivery of the energy. The higher the power, the quicker the battery's stored energy is delivered. A higher power output will cause the battery's stored energy to be depleted in a shorter time period.

=== Annualized power ===
Electric energy production and consumption are sometimes reported on a yearly basis, in units such as megawatt-hours per year (MWh/yr) gigawatt-hours/year (GWh/yr) or terawatt-hours per year (TWh/yr). These units have dimensions of energy divided by time and thus are units of power. They can be converted to SI power units by dividing by the number of hours in a year, about 8760 h/yr.

Thus, 1 GWh/yr = 1 GWh/8760 h ≈ 114.12 kW.

=== Misuse of watts per hour ===
Many compound units for various kinds of rates explicitly mention units of time to indicate a change over time. For example: miles per hour, kilometres per hour, dollars per hour. Power units, such as kW, already measure the rate of energy per unit time (kW=kJ/s). Kilowatt-hours are a product of power and time, not a rate of change of power with time.

Watts per hour (W/h) is a unit of a change of power per hour, i.e. an acceleration in the delivery of energy. It is used to measure the daily variation of demand (e.g. the slope of the duck curve), or ramp-up behavior of power plants. For example, a power plant that reaches a power output of 1 MW from 0 MW in 15 minutes has a ramp-up rate of 4 MW/h.

Other uses of terms such as watts per hour are likely to be errors.

== Other related energy units ==
Several other units related to kilowatt-hour are commonly used to indicate power or energy capacity or use in specific application areas.

Average annual energy production or consumption can be expressed in kilowatt-hours per year. This is used with loads or output that vary during the year but whose annual totals are similar from one year to the next. For example, it is useful to compare the energy efficiency of household appliances whose power consumption varies with time or the season of the year. Another use is to measure the energy produced by a distributed power source. One kilowatt-hour per year equals about 114.08 milliwatts applied constantly during one year.

The Board of Trade unit (B.T.U.) is an obsolete UK synonym for kilowatt-hour. The term derives from the name of the Board of Trade which regulated the electricity industry until 1942 when the Ministry of Power took over. It is distinct from a British Thermal Unit (BTU) which is 1055 J.

In India, the kilowatt-hour is often simply called a unit of energy. A million units, designated MU, is a gigawatt-hour and a BU (billion units) is a terawatt-hour.

== Related units ==
The capacity of a battery is usually expressed in ampere-hours (Ah). It can be calculated from the battery energy in watt-hours (Wh) by multiplying by the voltage of the power source. This value is approximate, since the battery voltage is not constant during its discharge, and because higher discharge rates reduce the total amount of energy that the battery can provide. In the case of devices that output a different voltage than the battery, it is the battery voltage (typically 3.7 V for Li-ion) that must be used to calculate rather than the device output (for example, usually 5.0 V for USB portable chargers). This results in a 500 mA USB device running for about 3.7 hours on a 2,500 mAh battery, not five hours.

== See also ==
- Ampere-hour
- Electric vehicle battery
- Electric energy consumption
- IEEE Std 260.1-2004
- Orders of magnitude (energy)
