= Statohm =

The statohm (symbol: statΩ) is the unit of electrical resistance in the electrostatic system of units which was part of the CGS system of units based upon the centimetre, gram and second.

The static units in that system are related to the corresponding electromagnetic units by a factor of the speed of light. Those units are known as absolute units, and so the counterpart of the statohm is the abohm (abΩ), and their proportions are:

1 statΩ ≘ c^{2} abΩ ≈ 8.987552×10^{20} abΩ where c is the speed of light in centimetres per second.

These units are not common now. The SI unit of resistance is the ohm (Ω). The statohm is nearly a trillion times larger than the ohm and is the largest unit of resistance ever used in any measurement system. The statohm as a practical unit is as unusably large as the abohm is unusably small.

1 statΩ ≘ c^{2} × 10^{−9} Ω ≈ 8.987552×10^{11} Ω

The sign ≘ denotes 'correspondence' between quantities. Equality does not apply, since the systems of quantities underlying the two systems of units are mutually incompatible.
