= IEEE Std 260.1-2004 =

Standardized letter symbols for units of measurement

IEEE Std 260.1-2004 was a standard from the Institute of Electrical and Electronics Engineers that provided standard letter symbols for units of measurement for use in all applications in multiple contexts. It has been withdrawn.

It covers primarily SI units and customary inch–pound units. The symbols are sorted in alphabetical order of name from ampere (symbol A) to zetta (symbol Z), including barrel (symbol bbl), bit (symbol b), foot (symbol ft), inch (symbol in), microinch (symbol μin), kibibyte (symbol KiB), kilowatthour (symbol kWh), quart (symbol qt), slug (symbol slug) and year (symbol a). In some cases the same symbol is used for different units. Examples are the symbols B (for bel and byte), Gb (for gigabit and gilbert), L (for liter and lambert) and rad (for rad and radian).

== See also ==
- ISO 80000
