= Abohm =

Unit of electrical resistance in emu-cgs system

abohm
- Unit system: CGS-EMU
- Unit of: electrical resistance
- Symbol: abΩ
- Named after: Georg Ohm
- In CGS base units: cm/s

Conversions
1 abΩ in ...	... corresponds to ...
- SI units: 10^{−9} Ω

The abohm is the derived unit of electrical resistance in the centimeter-gram-second system of units. One abohm corresponds to 10^{−9} ohms in the SI system of units, which is a nanoohm.

The emu-cgs (or "electromagnetic cgs") units are one of several systems of electromagnetic units within the centimetre gram second system of units; others include esu-cgs, Gaussian units, and Heaviside–Lorentz units. In these other systems, the abohm is not one of the units.

When a current of one abampere (1 abA) flows through a resistance of 1 abohm, the resulting potential difference across the component is one abvolt (1 abV).

The name abohm was introduced by Kennelly in 1903 as a short name for the long name (absolute) electromagnetic cgs unit of resistance that was in use since the adoption of the cgs system in 1875. The abohm was coherent with the emu-cgs system, in contrast to the ohm, the practical unit of resistance that had been adopted too in 1875.

== See also ==
- Electrical resistance
- Statohm
