= Ohm =

SI derived unit of electrical resistance

ohm
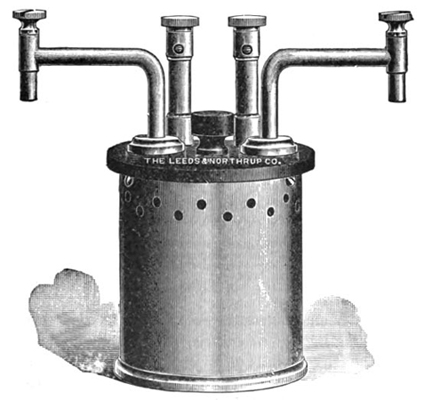
- A laboratory one-ohm standard resistor, c. 1917

General information
- Unit system: SI
- Unit of: electrical resistance
- Symbol: Ω
- Named after: Georg Ohm

Conversions
| 1 Ω in ... | ... is equal to ... |
- SI base units: kg⋅m^{2}⋅s^{−3}⋅A^{−2}

The ohm (symbol: Ω, the uppercase Greek letter omega) is the unit of electrical resistance in the International System of Units (SI). It is named after German physicist Georg Ohm (1789–1854). Various empirically derived standard units for electrical resistance were developed in connection with early telegraphy practice, and the British Association for the Advancement of Science proposed a unit derived from existing units of mass, length and time, and of a convenient scale for practical work as early as 1861.

Following the 2019 revision of the SI, in which the ampere and the kilogram were redefined in terms of fundamental constants, the ohm is now also defined as an exact value in terms of these constants.

== Definition ==
The ohm is defined as an electrical resistance between two points of a conductor when a constant potential difference of one volt (V), applied to these points, produces in the conductor a current of one ampere (A), the conductor not being the seat of any electromotive force.

$$\Omega = \frac{\mathrm{V}}{\mathrm{A}}
= \frac{1}{\mathrm{S}}
= \frac{\mathrm{W}}{\mathrm{A^{2}}}
= \frac{\mathrm{V}^{2}}{\mathrm{W}}
= \frac{\mathrm{s}}{\mathrm{F}}
= \frac{\mathrm{H}}{\mathrm{s}}
= \frac{\mathrm{Wb}}{\mathrm{C}}
= \frac{\mathrm{J{\cdot}s}}{\mathrm{C^{2}}}
= \frac{\mathrm{J}}{\mathrm{s{\cdot}A^{2}}}
= \frac{\mathrm{kg{\cdot}m^{2}}}{\mathrm{s{\cdot}C^{2}}}
= \frac{\mathrm{kg{\cdot}m^{2}}}{\mathrm{s^{3}{\cdot}A^{2}}}$$

In many cases the resistance of a conductor is approximately constant within a certain range of voltages, temperatures, and other parameters. These are called linear resistors. In other cases resistance varies, such as in the case of the thermistor, which exhibits a strong dependence of its resistance with temperature.

In the US, consecutive vowels in the prefixed units "kiloohm" and "megaohm" are commonly reduced to one, producing "kilohm" and "megohm".

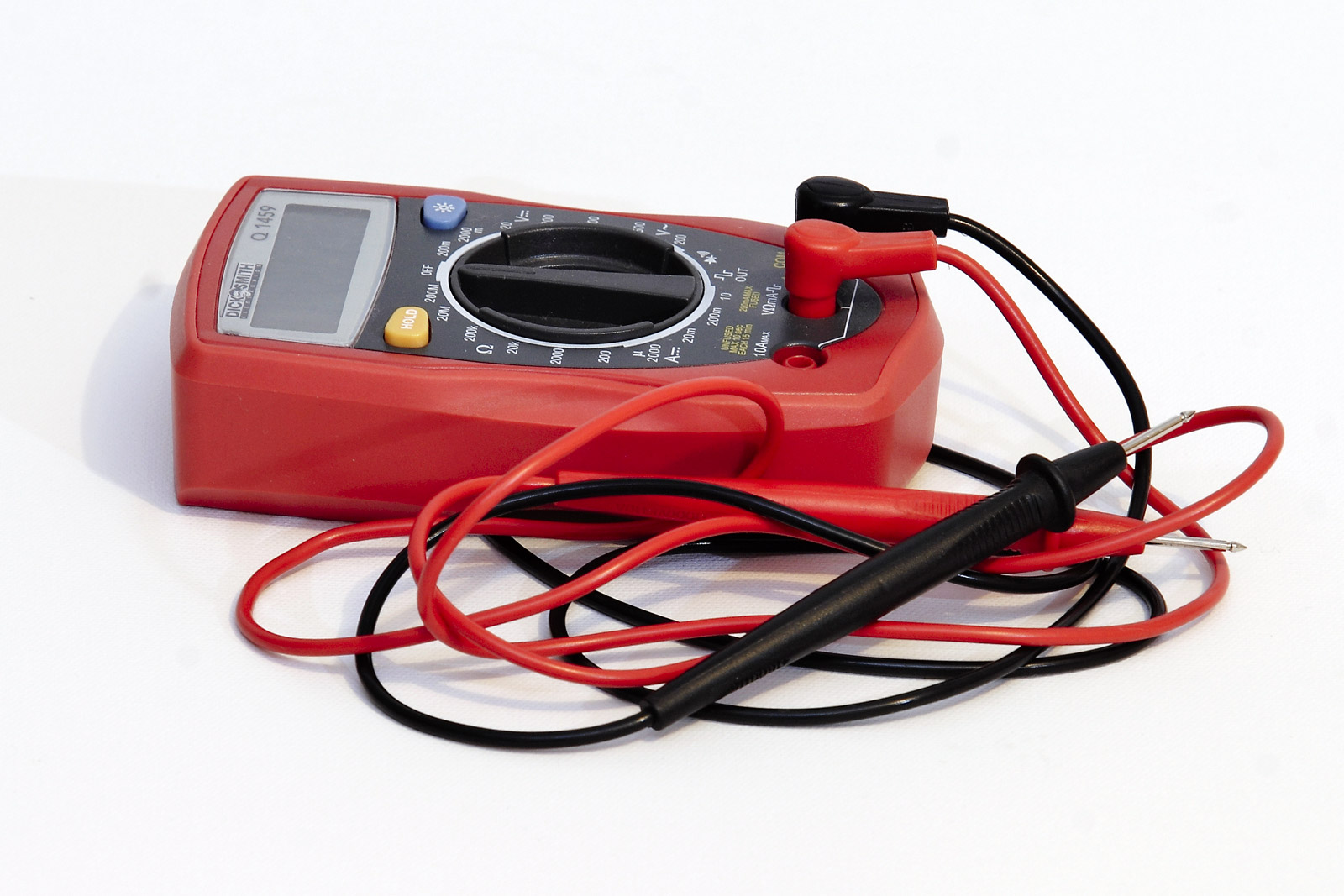
One of the functions of many types of multimeters is the measurement of resistance in ohms.

In alternating current circuits, electrical impedance is also measured in ohms.

=== Relation to conductance ===
The siemens (S) is the SI derived unit of electric conductance and admittance, historically known as the "mho" (ohm spelled backwards, symbol is ℧); it is one reciprocal ohm: 1 S = 1 Ω^{−1}.

== Power as a function of resistance ==
The power dissipated by a resistor may be calculated from its resistance, and the voltage or current involved. The formula is a combination of Ohm's law and Joule's law:
$$P=V I =\frac{V^2}{R} = I^2 R,$$

where P is the power, R is the resistance, V is the voltage across the resistor, and I is the current through the resistor.

A linear resistor has a constant resistance value over all applied voltages or currents; many practical resistors are linear over a useful range of currents. Non-linear resistors have a value that may vary depending on the applied voltage (or current). Where alternating current is applied to the circuit (or where the resistance value is a function of time), the relation above is true at any instant, but calculation of average power over an interval of time requires integration of "instantaneous" power over that interval.

Since the ohm belongs to a coherent system of units, when each of these quantities has its corresponding SI unit (watt for P, ohm for R, volt for V and ampere for I, which are related as in § Definition) this formula remains valid numerically when these units are used (and thought of as being cancelled or omitted).

== History ==
The rapid rise of electrotechnology in the last half of the 19th century created a demand for a rational, coherent, consistent, and international system of units for electrical quantities. Telegraphers and other early users of electricity in the 19th century needed a practical standard unit of measurement for resistance. Resistance was often expressed as a multiple of the resistance of a standard length of telegraph wires; different agencies used different bases for a standard, so units were not readily interchangeable. Electrical units so defined were not a coherent system with the units for energy, mass, length, and time, requiring conversion factors to be used in calculations relating energy or power to resistance.

Two different methods of establishing a system of electrical units can be chosen. Various artifacts, such as a length of wire or a standard electrochemical cell, could be specified as producing defined quantities for resistance, voltage, and so on. Alternatively, the electrical units can be related to the mechanical units by defining, for example, a unit of current that gives a specified force between two wires, or a unit of charge that gives a unit of force between two unit charges. This latter method ensures coherence with the units of energy. Defining a unit for resistance that is coherent with units of energy and time in effect also requires defining units for potential and current. It is desirable that one unit of electrical potential will force one unit of electric current through one unit of electrical resistance, doing one unit of work in one unit of time, otherwise, all electrical calculations will require conversion factors.

Since so-called "absolute" units of charge and current are expressed as combinations of units of mass, length, and time, dimensional analysis of the relations between potential, current, and resistance show that resistance is expressed in units of length per time – a velocity. Some early definitions of a unit of resistance, for example, defined a unit resistance as one quadrant of the Earth per second.

The absolute-unit system related magnetic and electrostatic quantities to metric base units of mass, time, and length. These units had the great advantage of simplifying the equations used in the solution of electromagnetic problems, and eliminated conversion factors in calculations about electrical quantities. However, the centimeter–gram–second, CGS, units turned out to have impractical sizes for practical measurements.

Various artifact standards were proposed as the definition of the unit of resistance. In 1860 Werner Siemens (1816–1892) published a suggestion for a reproducible resistance standard in Poggendorff's Annalen der Physik und Chemie. He proposed a column of pure mercury, of one square millimeter cross section, one meter long: Siemens mercury unit. However, this unit was not coherent with other units. One proposal was to devise a unit based on a mercury column that would be coherent – in effect, adjusting the length to make the resistance one ohm. Not all users of units had the resources to carry out metrology experiments to the required precision, so working standards notionally based on the physical definition were required.

In 1861, Latimer Clark (1822–1898) and Sir Charles Bright (1832–1888) presented a paper at the British Association for the Advancement of Science meeting suggesting that standards for electrical units be established and suggesting names for these units derived from eminent philosophers, 'Ohma', 'Farad' and 'Volt'. The BAAS in 1861 appointed a committee including Maxwell and Thomson to report upon standards of electrical resistance. Their objectives were to devise a unit that was of convenient size, part of a complete system for electrical measurements, coherent with the units for energy, stable, reproducible and based on the French metrical system. In the third report of the committee, 1864, the resistance unit is referred to as "B.A. unit, or Ohmad". By 1867 the unit is referred to as simply ohm.

The B.A. ohm was intended to be 10^{9} CGS units but owing to an error in calculations the definition was 1.3% too small. The error was significant for preparation of working standards.

On 21 September 1881 the International Electrical Congress defined a practical unit of ohm for the resistance, based on CGS units, using a mercury column 1 mm^{2} in cross-section, approximately 104.9 cm in length at 0 °C, similar to the apparatus suggested by Siemens.

A legal ohm, a reproducible standard, was defined by the international conference of electricians at Paris in 1884 as the resistance of a mercury column of specified weight and 106 cm long; this was a compromise value between the B. A. unit (equivalent to 104.7 cm), the Siemens unit (100 cm by definition), and the CGS unit. Although called "legal", this standard was not adopted by any national legislation. The "international" ohm was recommended by unanimous resolution at the International Electrical Congress 1893 in Chicago. The unit was based upon the ohm equal to 10^{9} units of resistance of the C.G.S. system of electromagnetic units. The international ohm is represented by the resistance offered to an unvarying electric current in a mercury column of constant cross-sectional area 106.3 cm long of mass 14.4521 grams and 0 °C. This definition became the basis for the legal definition of the ohm in several countries. In 1908, this definition was adopted by scientific representatives from several countries at the International Conference on Electric Units and Standards in London. The mercury column standard was maintained until the 1948 General Conference on Weights and Measures, at which the ohm was redefined in absolute terms instead of as an artifact standard.

By the end of the 19th century, units were well understood and consistent. Definitions would change with little effect on commercial uses of the units. Advances in metrology allowed definitions to be formulated with a high degree of precision and repeatability.

=== Historical units of resistance ===
| Unit | Definition | Value in B.A. ohms | Remarks |
|---|---|---|---|
| Absolute foot/second × 10^{7} | using imperial units | 0.3048 | considered obsolete even in 1884 |
| Thomson's unit | using imperial units | 0.3202 | 100 million ft/s (30,480 km/s), considered obsolete even in 1884 |
| Jacobi copper unit | A specified copper wire 25 ft (7.620 m) long weighing 345 gr (22.36 g) | 0.6367 | Used in 1850s |
| Weber's absolute unit × 10^{7} | Based on the meter and the second | 0.9191 | |
| Siemens mercury unit | 1860. A column of pure mercury | 0.9537 | 100 cm and 1 mm^{2} cross section at 0 °C |
| British Association (B.A.) "ohm" | 1863 | 1.000 | Standard coils deposited at Kew Observatory in 1863 |
| Digney, Breguet, Swiss | | 9.266–10.420 | Iron wire 1 km long and 4 mm^{2} cross section |
| Matthiessen | | 13.59 | 1 mi (1.609 km) of 1/16-inch-diameter (1.588 mm) pure annealed copper wire at 15.5 °C |
| Varley | | 25.61 | One mile of special 1/16-inch-diameter copper wire |
| German mile | | 57.44 | A German mile (8,238 yd or 7,533 m) of iron wire 1/6 in (4.233 mm) diameter |
| Abohm | | 10^{−9} | Electromagnetic absolute unit in centimeter–gram–second units |
| Statohm | | 8.987551787×10^{11} | Electrostatic absolute unit in centimeter–gram–second units |

== Realization of standards ==
The mercury column method of realizing a physical standard ohm turned out to be difficult to reproduce, owing to the effects of non-constant cross section of the glass tubing. Various resistance coils were constructed by the British Association and others, to serve as physical artifact standards for the unit of resistance. The long-term stability and reproducibility of these artifacts was an ongoing field of research, as the effects of temperature, air pressure, humidity, and time on the standards were detected and analyzed.

Artifact standards are still used, but metrology experiments relating accurately dimensioned inductors and capacitors provided a more fundamental basis for the definition of the ohm. Since 1990 the quantum Hall effect has been used to define the ohm with high precision and repeatability. The quantum Hall experiments are used to check the stability of working standards that have convenient values for comparison.

Following the 2019 revision of the SI, in which the ampere and the kilogram were redefined in terms of fundamental constants, the ohm is now also defined in terms of these constants.

== Symbol ==
The symbol Ω was suggested, because of the similar sound of ohm and omega, by William Henry Preece in 1867. In documents printed before the Second World War the unit symbol often consisted of the raised lowercase omega (ω), such that 56 Ω was written as 56^{ω}.

Historically, some document editing software applications have used the Symbol typeface to render the character Ω. Where the font is not supported, the same document may be displayed with a "W" ("10 W" instead of "10 Ω", for instance). As W represents the watt, the SI unit of power, this can lead to confusion, making the use of the correct Unicode code point preferable.

Where the character set is limited to ASCII, the IEEE 260.1 standard recommends using the unit name "ohm" as a symbol instead of Ω.

In the electronics industry it is common to use the character R instead of the Ω symbol, thus, a 10 Ω resistor may be represented as 10R. This is part of the RKM code. It is used in many instances where the value has a decimal place. For example, 5.6 Ω is listed as 5R6, or 2200 Ω is listed as 2K2. This method avoids overlooking the decimal point, which may not be rendered reliably on components or when duplicating documents.

Unicode encodes the symbol as U+2126 Ω OHM SIGN, distinct from Greek omega among letterlike symbols, but it is canonically equivalent to the Greek uppercase omega character U+03A9 Ω GREEK CAPITAL LETTER OMEGA (&ohm;, &Omega;), which is thus preferred. In MS-DOS and Microsoft Windows, the alt code Alt+234 may produce the Ω symbol. In Mac OS, ⌥ Opt+Z does the same.

== See also ==
- Electronic color code, used for indicating the value of resistors
- History of measurement
- International Committee for Weights and Measures
- Orders of magnitude (resistance)
- Resistivity
