= Siemens mercury unit =

Obsolete unit of electrical resistance

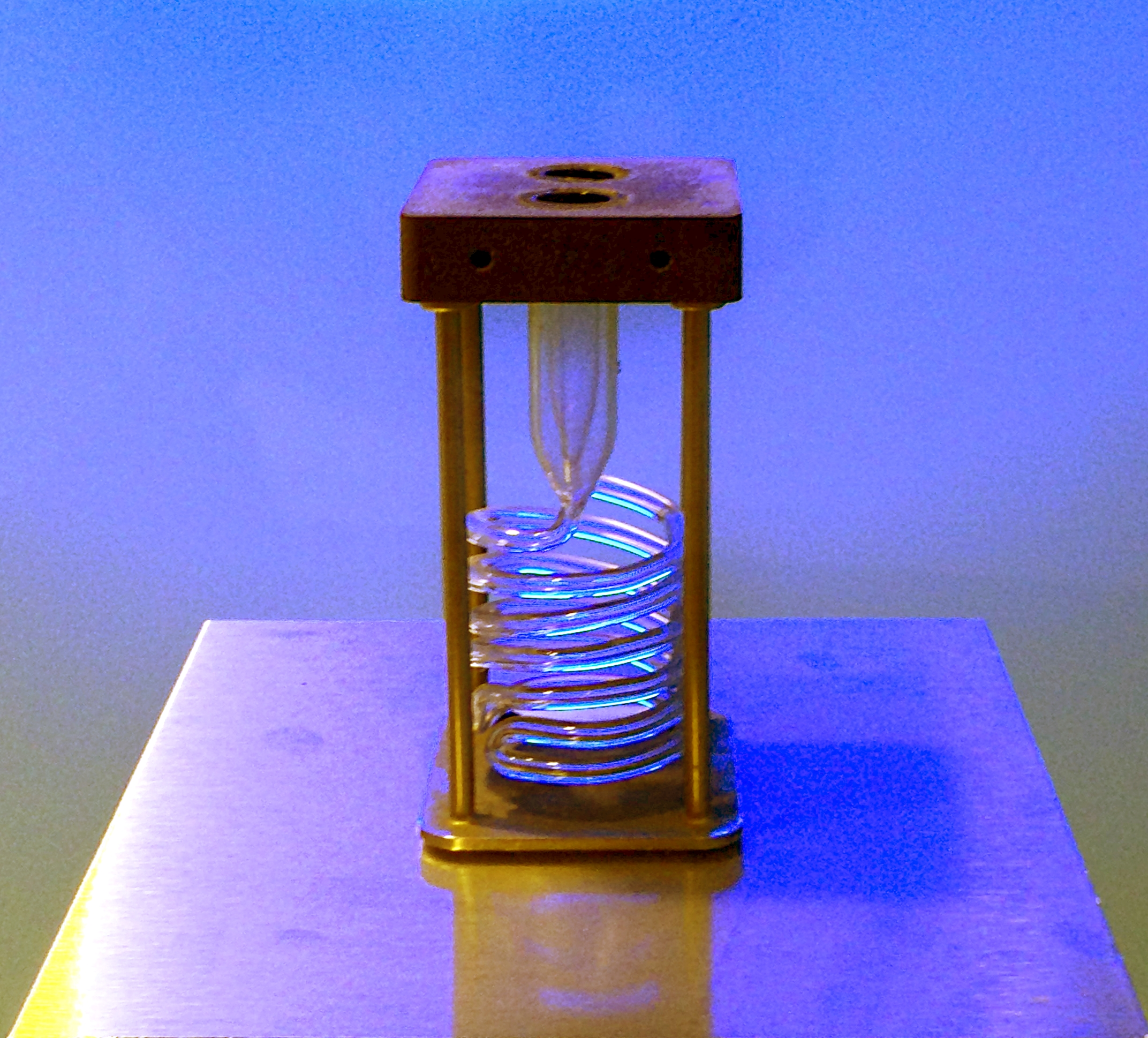
Mercury column resistance unit, about 1860, partially filled. (Munich, 2015)

The Siemens mercury unit is an obsolete unit of electrical resistance. It was defined by Werner von Siemens in 1860 as the resistance of a mercury column with a length of one metre and uniform cross-section of 1 mm^{2} held at a temperature of zero degrees Celsius. It is equivalent to approximately 0.953 ohm.

Glass tube cross sections are typically irregularly conical rather than perfect cylinders, which presented a problem in constructing precise measuring devices. One could make many tubes and test them for conical regularity, discarding the least regular ones; their regularity can be measured by inserting a small drop of mercury into one end of the tube, then measuring its length while sucking it along. The cross-sectional area at each end can then be measured by filling the tube with pure mercury at a fixed temperature, weighing it, and comparing that weight to the relative lengths of the mercury drop at each end. The tube can then be used for measurement by applying a formula obtained from these measurements that corrects for its conical shape.

The Siemens mercury unit was superseded in 1881 by the ohm; the name "siemens" was later reused for a unit of electric conductance.
