= Unified Code for Units of Measure =

System of codes for unambiguously representing measurement units

The Unified Code for Units of Measure (UCUM) is a system of codes for unambiguously representing measurement units. Its primary purpose is machine-to-machine communication rather than communication between humans. UCUM is used by different organizations like IEEE, and standards like DICOM, LOINC, HL7, and ISO 11240:2012.

The code set includes all units defined in ISO 1000, ISO 2955-1983, (Note: Withdrawn without replacement.) ANSI X3.50-1986, (Note: Superseded by ISO 5807.) HL7 and ENV 12435, and explicitly and verifiably addresses the naming conflicts and ambiguities in those standards to resolve them. It provides for representations of units in 7 bit ASCII for machine-to-machine communication, with unambiguous mapping between case-sensitive and case-insensitive representations.

A reference open-source implementation is available as a Java applet. There is also an OSGi-based implementation at Eclipse Foundation.

== Base units ==
Units are represented in UCUM with reference to a set of seven base units. The UCUM base units are the metre for measurement of length, the second for time, the gram for mass, the coulomb for charge, the kelvin for temperature, the candela for luminous intensity, and the radian for plane angle. The UCUM base units form a set of mutually independent dimensions as required by dimensional analysis.

Some of the UCUM base units are different from the SI base units. UCUM is compatible with, but not isomorphic with, SI. There are four differences between the two sets of base units:

1. The gram is the base unit of mass instead of the kilogram, since in UCUM base units do not have prefixes.
2. Electric charge is the base quantity for electromagnetic phenomena instead of electric current, since the elementary charge of electrons is more fundamental physically.
3. The mole is dimensionless in UCUM, since it can be defined in terms of the Avogadro number,
4. The radian is a distinct base unit for plane angle, to distinguish angular velocity from rotational frequency and to distinguish the radian from the steradian for solid angles.

UCUM base units
Name	Symbol	Measure	Dimension symbol
metre	m	length	L
second	s	time	T
gram	g	mass	M
coulomb	C	charge	Q
kelvin	K	thermodynamic temperature	C
candela	cd	luminous intensity	F
radian	rad	plane angle	A

== Metric and non-metric units ==
UCUM Metric prefixes
Prefix	UCUM Symbol	Factor	Power
yotta	Y	1000000000000000000000000	10^{24}
zetta	Z	1000000000000000000000	10^{21}
exa	E	1000000000000000000	10^{18}
peta	P	1000000000000000	10^{15}
tera	T	1000000000000	10^{12}
giga	G	1000000000	10^{9}
mega	M	1000000	10^{6}
kilo	k	1000	10^{3}
hecto	h	100	10^{2}
deca	da	10	10^{1}
(none)	(none)	1	10^{0}
deci	d	0.1	10^{−1}
centi	c	0.01	10^{−2}
milli	m	0.001	10^{−3}
micro	u	0.000001	10^{−6}
nano	n	0.000000001	10^{−9}
pico	p	0.000000000001	10^{−12}
femto	f	0.000000000000001	10^{−15}
atto	a	0.000000000000000001	10^{−18}
zepto	z	0.000000000000000000001	10^{−21}
yocto	y	0.000000000000000000000001	10^{−24}

Each unit represented in UCUM is identified as either "metric" or "non-metric". Metric units can accept metric prefixes as in SI. Non-metric units are not permitted to be used with prefixes. All of the base units are metric.

UCUM refers to units that are defined on non-ratio scales as "special units". Common examples include the bel and degree Celsius. While these are not considered metric units by UCUM, UCUM nevertheless allows metric prefixes to be used with them where this is common practice.

Binary prefixes are also supported.

UCUM Binary prefixes
Prefix	UCUM Symbol	Factor	Power
tebi	Ti	1099511627776	2^{40}
gibi	Gi	1073741824	2^{30}
mebi	Mi	1048576	2^{20}
kibi	Ki	1024	2^{10}

== Arbitrary units ==
UCUM recognizes units that are defined by a particular measurement procedure, and which cannot be related to the base units. These units are identified as "arbitrary units". Arbitrary units are not commensurable with any other unit; measurements in arbitrary units cannot be compared with or converted into measurements in any other units. Many of the recognized arbitrary units are used in biochemistry and medicine.

== Derived units ==
Any metric unit in any common system of units can be expressed in terms of the UCUM base units.

Units derived from UCUM base units
Name	Symbol	Quantity	UCUM base unit Equivalents
hertz	Hz	frequency	s^{−1}
steradian	sr (Note: In the SI, both the radian and steradian are dimensionless derived units.)	solid angle	rad^{2}
millinewton	mN	force, weight	g⋅m⋅s^{−2}
millipascal	mPa	pressure, stress	g⋅m^{−1}⋅s^{−2}
millijoule	mJ	energy, work, heat	g⋅m^{2}⋅s^{−2}
milliwatt	mW	power, radiant flux	g⋅m^{2}⋅s^{−3}
ampere	A (Note: In the SI, the coulomb is derived from the ampere. 1 C = 1 A × 1 s.)	electric current	C⋅s^{−1}
millivolt	mV	voltage, electrical potential difference, electromotive force	g⋅m^{2}⋅s^{−2}⋅C^{−1}
kilofarad	kF	electrical capacitance	g^{−1}⋅m^{−2}⋅s^{3}⋅C^{2}
milliohm	mΩ	electrical resistance, impedance, reactance	g⋅m^{2}⋅s^{−1}⋅C^{−2}
kilosiemens	kS	electrical conductance	g^{−1}⋅m^{−2}⋅s^{1}⋅C^{2}
milliweber	mWb	magnetic flux	g⋅m^{2}⋅s^{−1}⋅C^{−1}
millitesla	mT	magnetic induction, magnetic flux density	g⋅s^{−1}⋅C^{−1}
millihenry	mH	electrical inductance	g⋅m^{2}⋅C^{−2}
degree Celsius	°C	Celsius temperature	K
lumen	lm	luminous flux	cd⋅rad^{2}
lux	lx	illuminance	m^{−2}⋅cd⋅rad^{2}
becquerel	Bq	radioactivity (decays per unit time)	s^{−1}
gray	Gy	absorbed dose (of ionizing radiation)	m^{2}⋅s^{−2}
sievert	Sv	equivalent dose (of ionizing radiation)	m^{2}⋅s^{−2}
Notes

Kinematic units
Name	Symbol	Quantity	Expression in terms of UCUM base units
metre per second	m/s	speed, velocity	m⋅s^{−1}
metre per second squared	m/s^{2}	acceleration	m⋅s^{−2}
metre per second cubed	m/s^{3}	jerk, jolt	m⋅s^{−3}
metre per second to the fourth	m/s^{4}	snap, jounce	m⋅s^{−4}
radian per second	rad/s	angular velocity	rad⋅s^{−1}
radian per second squared	rad/s^{2}	angular acceleration	rad⋅s^{−2}
hertz per second	Hz/s	frequency drift	s^{−2}
cubic metre per second	m^{3}/s	volumetric flow	m^{3}⋅s^{−1}

Mechanical units
Name	Symbol	Quantity	Expression in terms of UCUM base units
square metre	m^{2}	area	m^{2}
cubic metre	m^{3}	volume	m^{3}
millinewton second	mN⋅s	momentum, impulse	m⋅g⋅s^{−1}
millijoule second per radian	mN⋅m⋅s/rad	angular momentum	m^{2}⋅g⋅rad⋅s^{−1}
millijoule per radian	mN⋅m/rad = mJ/rad	torque	m^{2}⋅g⋅rad⋅s^{−2}
millinewton per second	mN/s	yank	m⋅g⋅s^{−3}
reciprocal metre	m^{−1}	wavenumber, optical power, curvature, spatial frequency	m^{−1}
gram per square metre	g/m^{2}	area density	m^{−2}⋅g
gram per cubic metre	g/m^{3}	density, mass density	m^{−3}⋅g
cubic metre per gram	m^{3}/g	specific volume	m^{3}⋅g^{−1}
millijoule second	mJ⋅s	action	m^{2}⋅g⋅s^{−1}
millijoule per gram	mJ/g	specific energy	m^{2}⋅s^{−2}
millijoule per cubic metre	mJ/m^{3}	energy density	m^{−1}⋅g⋅s^{−2}
millinewton per metre	mN/m = mJ/m^{2}	surface tension, stiffness	g⋅s^{−2}
milliwatt per square metre	mW/m^{2}	heat flux density, irradiance	g⋅s^{−3}
square metre per second	m^{2}/s	kinematic viscosity, thermal diffusivity, diffusion coefficient	m^{2}⋅s^{−1}
millipascal second	mPa⋅s = mN⋅s/m^{2}	dynamic viscosity	m^{−1}⋅g⋅s^{−1}
gram per metre	g/m	linear mass density	m^{−1}⋅g
gram per second	g/s	mass flow rate	g⋅s^{−1}
milliwatt per steradian square metre	mW/(sr⋅m^{2})	radiance	g⋅rad^{−2}⋅s^{−3}
milliwatt per steradian cubic metre	mW/(sr⋅m^{3})	radiance	m^{−1}⋅g⋅rad^{−2}⋅s^{−3}
milliwatt per metre	mW/m	spectral power	m⋅g⋅s^{−3}
gray per second	Gy/s	absorbed dose rate	m^{2}⋅s^{−3}
metre per cubic metre	m/m^{3}	fuel efficiency	m^{−2}
milliwatt per cubic metre	mW/m^{3}	spectral irradiance, power density	m^{−1}⋅g⋅s^{−3}
millijoule per square metre second	mJ/(m^{2}⋅s)	energy flux density	g⋅s^{−3}
reciprocal millipascal	mPa^{−1}	compressibility	m⋅g^{−1}⋅s^{2}
millijoule per square metre	mJ/m^{2}	radiant exposure	g⋅s^{−2}
gram square metre per steradian	g⋅m^{2}/sr	moment of inertia	m^{2}⋅g⋅rad^{−2}
millijoule second per radian per gram	mN⋅m⋅s/rad/g	specific angular momentum	m^{2}⋅s^{−1}⋅rad^{−1}
milliwatt per steradian	mW/sr	radiant intensity	m^{2}⋅g⋅rad^{−2}⋅s^{−3}
milliwatt per steradian metre	mW/(sr⋅m)	spectral intensity	m⋅g⋅rad^{−2}⋅s^{−3}

Electromagnetic units
Name	Symbol	Quantity	Expression in terms of UCUM base units
coulomb per square metre	C/m^{2}	electric displacement field, polarization density	m^{−2}⋅C
coulomb per cubic metre	C/m^{3}	electric charge density	m^{−3}⋅C
ampere per square metre	A/m^{2}	electric current density	m^{−2}⋅s^{−1}⋅C
kilosiemens per metre	kS/m	electrical conductivity	m^{−3}⋅g^{−1}⋅s^{1}⋅C^{2}
kilofarad per metre	kF/m	permittivity	m^{−3}⋅g^{−1}⋅s^{2}⋅C^{2}
millihenry per metre	mH/m	magnetic permeability	m⋅g⋅C^{−2}
millivolt per metre	mV/m	electric field strength	m⋅g⋅s^{−2}⋅C^{−1}
ampere per metre	A/m	magnetization, magnetic field strength	m^{−1}⋅s^{−1}⋅C
coulomb per gram	C/g	exposure (X and gamma rays)	g^{−1}⋅C
milliohm metre	mΩ⋅m	resistivity	m^{3}⋅g⋅s^{−1}⋅C^{−2}
coulomb per metre	C/m	linear charge density	m^{−1}⋅C
millijoule per millitesla	mJ/mT	magnetic dipole moment	m^{2}⋅s^{−1}⋅C
square metre per millivolt second	m^{2}/(mV⋅s)	electron mobility	g^{−1}⋅s⋅C
reciprocal millihenry	mH^{−1}	magnetic reluctance	m^{−2}⋅g^{−1}⋅C^{2}
milliweber per metre	mWb/m	magnetic vector potential	m⋅g⋅s^{−1}⋅C^{−1}
milliweber metre	mWb⋅m	magnetic moment	m^{3}⋅g⋅s^{−1}⋅C^{−1}
millitesla metre	mT⋅m	magnetic rigidity	m⋅g⋅s^{−1}⋅C^{−1}
ampere radian	A⋅rad	magnetomotive force	C⋅rad⋅s^{−1}
metre per millihenry	m/mH	magnetic susceptibility	m^{−1}⋅g^{−1}⋅C^{2}

Photometric units
Name	Symbol	Quantity	Expression in terms of UCUM base units
lumen second	lm⋅s	luminous energy	s⋅cd⋅rad^{2}
lux second	lx⋅s	luminous exposure	m^{−2}⋅s⋅cd⋅rad^{2}
candela per square metre	cd/m^{2}	luminance	m^{−2}⋅cd
lumen per milliwatt	lm/mW	luminous efficacy	m^{−2}⋅g^{−1}⋅s^{3}⋅cd⋅rad^{2}

Thermodynamic units
Name	Symbol	Quantity	Expression in terms of UCUM base units
millijoule per kelvin	mJ/K	heat capacity, entropy	m^{2}⋅g⋅s^{−2}⋅K^{−1}
millijoule per gram kelvin	mJ/(K⋅g)	specific heat capacity, specific entropy	m^{2}⋅s^{−2}⋅K^{−1}
milliwatt per metre kelvin	mW/(m⋅K)	thermal conductivity	m⋅g⋅s^{−3}⋅K^{−1}
kelvin per milliwatt	K/mW	thermal resistance	m^{−2}⋅g^{−1}⋅s^{3}⋅K
reciprocal kelvin	K^{−1}	thermal expansion coefficient	K^{−1}
kelvin per metre	K/m	temperature gradient	m^{−1}⋅K

== See also ==
- Outline of metrology and measurement
- GNU Units
- International vocabulary of metrology
