= Stanislas Julien =

French sinologist

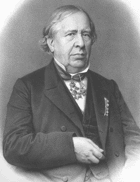
- Born: 13 April 1797; Orléans, France
- Died: 14 February 1873 (aged 75); Paris, France
- Scientific career
- Workplaces: Collège de France
- Academic advisors: Jean-Pierre Abel-Rémusat
- Notable students: Édouard Biot; Marquis d'Hervey-Saint-Denys

Chinese name
- Traditional Chinese: 儒蓮
- Simplified Chinese: 儒莲
Transcriptions
Standard Mandarin
- Hanyu Pinyin: Rú Lián

Stanislas Aignan Julien (13 April 1797 – 14 February 1873) was a French sinologist who served as the Chair of Chinese at the Collège de France for over 40 years.

Julien was a student of Jean-Pierre Abel-Rémusat, and succeeded him as the chair of Chinese at the Collège de France upon Rémusat's death in 1832. The quantity and quality of Julien's scholarship earned him wide renown, and caused him to become the leading European scholar of China during the 19th century. Along with a few 19th-century scholars of China, Julien's academic reputation was rivaled only by the Scottish sinologist James Legge, and no sinologist equaled his academic reputation until Édouard Chavannes at the turn of the 20th century.

Despite his academic rigor, Julien had a notoriously difficult personality and was known publicly to feud with most of his contemporaries, earning broad academic respect along side widespread personal dislike from those who knew him.

== Biography ==
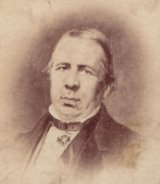
Julien, age 65 (1862)

Born at Orléans on 13 April 1797, Julien initially struggled to obtain higher education due to his family's relative poverty. He studied at the college in Orléans before transferring to the Collège de France, where he initially focused on Greek language and literature before branching out into Arabic, Hebrew, Persian, and Sanskrit. In 1821 he was appointed assistant professor of Greek. In the same year he published an edition of The Rape of Helen of Coluthus, with versions in French, Latin, English, German, Italian and Spanish. He attended the lectures of Jean-Pierre Abel-Rémusat on Chinese.

In late 1823 Julien met Jean-Pierre Abel-Rémusat, the first-ever professor of Chinese at the Collège de France, and began studying Chinese with him. In 1824, only six months after meeting Rémusat, Julien began a Latin translation of the Mencius, working from eight different Chinese editions and two Manchu editions, Julien having simultaneously begun studying Manchu. The work was published in Paris with the lengthy title Meng Tseu vel Mencium inter Sinenses philosophos, ingenio, doctrina, nominisque claritate Confucio proximum, edidit, Latina interpretatione, ad interpretationem Tartaricam utramque recensita, instruixit, et perpetuo commentario, e Sinicis deprompto, illustravit Stanislaus Julien. Julien's attention to textual variants among different editions was remarkable for his era, and was lauded by his teacher Rémusat, whose review gave such praises as: "M. Julien s'est livré à une lecture assidue du texte de Mencius; il a étudié le style de cet auteur, et s'est pénétré de tout ce que son langage offre de particulier." ("Mr. Julien has delivered an assiduous reading of the text of the Mencius; he has studied the style of this author, and has penetrated all that his language particularly has to offer.")

Soon afterwards he translated the modern Greek odes of Kalvos under the title of La Lyre patriotique de la Grèce. In 1827 he was appointed sublibrarian to the Institut de France. In 1832 he succeeded Abel-Rémusat as professor of Chinese at the Collège de France. In 1833 he was elected a member of the Académie des Inscriptions.

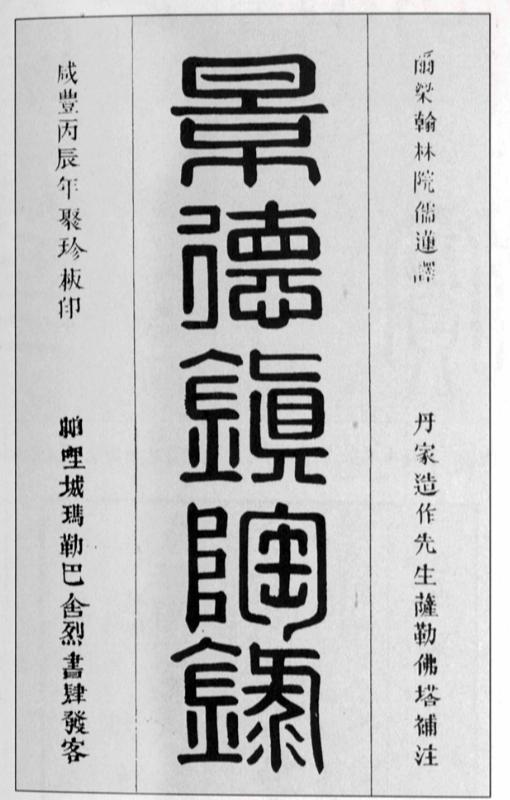
Histoire et Fabrication de la Porcelaine. The characters 景德鎮陶錄 Jingdezhen Taolu are in seal script

For some years his studies had been directed towards the vernacular literature of the Chinese, bringing out translations of Hoei-lan-ki 灰闌記 (L'Histoire du cercle de craie), a drama in which occurs a scene curiously analogous to the Judgement of Solomon; and the 趙氏孤兒 Zhao shi guer [Tchao-chi kou eul], The Orphan of Zhao, or Orphan of the House Tcho.

He next turned to the Taoist writings, and translated in 1835 Le Livre des récompenses et des peines 太上感應篇 Taishang Ganying Pian. About this time the cultivation of silkworms was beginning to attract attention in France, and by order of the minister of agriculture Julien compiled, in 1837, a Résumé des principaux traits chinois sur la culture des mûriers, et l'éducation des vers-de-soie 桑蠶輯要, which was speedily translated into English, German, Italian and Russian.

He published in 1841 Discussions grammaticales sur certaines régles de position qui, en chinois, jouent le même rôle que les inflexions dans les autres langues, which he followed in 1842 by Exercices pratiques d'analyse, de syntaxe, et de lexigraphie chinoise. Meanwhile, in 1839, he had been appointed joint keeper of the Bibliothèque Royale, with the special superintendence of the Chinese books, and shortly afterwards he was made administrator of the Collège de France.

In 1842 saw the publication of his translation of the 道德經 Dao De Jing. Then he turned his attention to the Buddhist literature of China, and more especially to the travels of Buddhist pilgrims to India. In order that he might better understand the references to Indian institutions and the transcriptions in Chinese of Sanskrit words and proper names, he began the study of Sanskrit, and in 1853 brought out his Voyages du pélerin Hiouen-tsang 大唐西域記 Da Tang Xi You Ji.

In 1843, he was elected as a member of the American Philosophical Society.

Julien became a member of the Royal Netherlands Academy of Arts and Sciences in 1857. In 1859 he published Les Avadanas, contes et apologues indiens inconnus jusqu'à ce jour, suivis de poésies et de nouvelles chinoises. For the benefit of future students he disclosed his system of deciphering Sanskrit words occurring in Chinese books in his Méthode pour déchiffrer et transcrire les noms sanscrits qui se rencontrent dans les livres chinois (1861). The work had escaped the author's observation that, since the translations of Sanskrit works into Chinese were undertaken in different parts of the empire, the same Sanskrit words were of necessity differently represented in Chinese characters in accordance with the dialectical variations. No hard and fast rule can therefore possibly be laid down for the decipherment of Chinese transcriptions of Sanskrit words.

Known for his impatience and bad temper, he had bitter controversies with his fellow Sinologists. His Indian studies led to a controversy with French historian Joseph Toussaint Reinaud. Among the many subjects to which he turned his attention were the native industries of China, producing the Histoire et fabrication de la porcelaine chinoise 景德鎮陶錄 Jingdezhen Taolu. In another volume he also published an account of the Industries anciennes et modernes de l'Empire chinois (1869), translated from native authorities.

His last work of importance was Syntaxe nouvelle de la langue Chinoise fondée sur la position des mots, suivie de deux traités sur les particules et les principaux termes de grammaire, d'une table des idiotismes, de fables, de légendes et d'apologues (1869), for many years the standard grammar for the Chinese language.

In politics Julien was imperialist, and in 1863 he was made a commander of the Légion d'honneur in recognition of the services he had rendered to literature during the Second French Empire.

In 1872 the Académie des Inscriptions et Belles-Lettres established the Prix Stanislas Julien, an annual prize for a sinological work which was first awarded in 1875.

== Selected works ==
- ——— (1824–29). Meng Tseu vel Mencium inter Sinenses philosophos, ingenio, doctrina, nominisque claritate Confucio proximum, edidit, Latina interpretatione, ad interpretationem Tartaricam utramque recensita, instruixit, et perpetuo commentario, e Sinicis deprompto, illustravit Stanislaus Julien (in Latin). Paris.
- ——— (1842). Le Livre de la Voie et de la Vertu, composé dans le VIe siècle avant l'ère chrétienne, par le philosophe Lao-Tseu, traduit en français et publié avec le texte chinois et un commentaire perpétuel [The Book of the Way and Virtue, Written in the 6th Century BC by the Philosopher Laozi, Translated into French and Published with the Chinese Text and a Running Commentary] (in French). Paris.
- ——— (1851). Mémoires sur les Contrées Occidentales [Records of the Western Regions] (in French). Paris.
- ——— (1856). Histoire de la Vie de Hiouen-Thsang [History of the Life of Xuanzang] (in French). Paris.
- ——— (1856). Histoire et Fabrication de la Porcelaine Chinoise [The History and Manufacturing of Chinese Porcelain] (in French). Paris.
- ——— (1869). Syntax Nouvelle de la Langue Chinoise [New Syntax of the Chinese Language] (in French). Paris.
