= Abhenry =

The abhenry is the centimetre–gram–second electromagnetic unit of inductance, corresponding to one billionth of a henry (1 nH).
