= Probability current =

Value for the flow of probability in quantum mechanics

In quantum mechanics, the probability current (sometimes called probability flux) is a mathematical quantity describing the flow of probability. Specifically, if one thinks of probability as a heterogeneous fluid, then the probability current is the rate of flow of this fluid. It is a real vector that changes with space and time. Probability currents are analogous to mass currents in hydrodynamics and electric currents in electromagnetism. As in those fields, the probability current (i.e. the probability current density) is related to the probability density function via a continuity equation. The probability current is invariant under gauge transformation.

The concept of probability current is also used outside of quantum mechanics, when dealing with probability density functions that change over time, for instance in Brownian motion and the Fokker–Planck equation.

The relativistic equivalent of the probability current is known as the probability four-current.

== Definition (non-relativistic 3-current) ==
=== Free spin-0 particle ===
In non-relativistic quantum mechanics, the probability current j of the wave function Ψ of a particle of mass m in one dimension is defined as
$$j = \frac{\hbar}{2mi} \left(\Psi^* \frac{\partial \Psi }{\partial x}- \Psi \frac{\partial \Psi^*}{\partial x} \right) = \frac{\hbar}{m} \Re\left\{\Psi^* \frac{1}{i} \frac{\partial \Psi }{\partial x} \right\} = \frac{\hbar}{m} \Im\left\{\Psi^* \frac{\partial \Psi }{\partial x} \right\},$$
where

- $\hbar$ is the reduced Planck constant;
- $\Psi^*$ denotes the complex conjugate of the wave function;
- $\Re$ denotes the real part;
- $\Im$ denotes the imaginary part.

Note that the probability current is proportional to a Wronskian $W(\Psi,\Psi^*).$

In three dimensions, this generalizes to
$$\mathbf j = \frac{\hbar}{2mi} \left( \Psi^* \mathbf \nabla \Psi - \Psi \mathbf \nabla \Psi^{*} \right) = \frac{\hbar}{m} \Re\left\{\Psi^* \frac{\nabla}{i} \Psi \right\} = \frac{\hbar}{m}\Im\left\{\Psi^* \nabla \Psi \right\} \,,$$
where $\nabla$ denotes the del or gradient operator. This can be simplified in terms of the kinetic momentum operator,
$$\mathbf{\hat{p}} = -i\hbar\nabla$$
to obtain
$$\mathbf j = \frac{1}{2m} \left(\Psi^* \mathbf{\hat{p}} \Psi + \Psi \left( \mathbf{\hat{p}} \Psi \right)^*\right)\,.$$

These definitions use the position basis (i.e. for a wavefunction in position space), but momentum space is possible. In fact, one can write the probability current operator as

$\mathbf{\hat{j}}(\mathbf{r}) = \frac{\mathbf{\hat{p}} |\mathbf{r}\rangle\langle\mathbf{r}|+|\mathbf{r}\rangle\langle\mathbf{r}|\mathbf{\hat{p}}}{2m}$

which do not depend on a particular choice of basis. The probability current is then the expectation of this operator,

$\mathbf{j}(\mathbf{r},t) = \langle \Psi(t)|\hat{\mathbf{j}}(\mathbf{r})| \Psi(t)\rangle.$

=== Spin-0 particle in an electromagnetic field ===
The above definition should be modified for a system in an external electromagnetic field. In SI units, a charged particle of mass m and electric charge q includes a term due to the interaction with the electromagnetic field;
$$\mathbf j = \frac{1}{2m}\left[\left(\Psi^* \mathbf{\hat{p}} \Psi - \Psi \mathbf{\hat{p}} \Psi^*\right) - 2q\mathbf{A} |\Psi|^2 \right]$$
where A = A(r, t) is the magnetic vector potential. The term qA has dimensions of momentum. Note that $\mathbf{\hat{p}} = -i\hbar\nabla$ used here is the canonical momentum and is not gauge invariant, unlike the kinetic momentum operator $\mathbf{\hat{P}} = -i\hbar\nabla-q\mathbf{A}$.

In Gaussian units:
$$\mathbf j = \frac{1}{2m}\left[\left(\Psi^* \mathbf{\hat{p}} \Psi - \Psi \mathbf{\hat{p}} \Psi^*\right) - 2\frac{q}{c} \mathbf{A} |\Psi|^2 \right]$$
where c is the speed of light.

=== Spin-s particle in an electromagnetic field ===
If the particle has spin, it has a corresponding magnetic moment, so an extra term needs to be added incorporating the spin interaction with the electromagnetic field.

According to Landau-Lifschitz's Course of Theoretical Physics the electric current density is in Gaussian units:
$$\mathbf{j}_e = \frac{q}{2m} \left[\left(\Psi^* \mathbf{\hat{p}} \Psi - \Psi \mathbf{\hat{p}} \Psi^*\right) - \frac{2q}{c} \mathbf{A} |\Psi|^2 \right] + \frac{\mu_S c}{s\hbar}\nabla\times(\Psi^* \mathbf{S}\Psi)$$

And in SI units:
$$\mathbf j_e = \frac{q}{2m}\left[\left(\Psi^* \mathbf{\hat{p}} \Psi - \Psi \mathbf{\hat{p}} \Psi^*\right) - 2q\mathbf{A} |\Psi|^2 \right] + \frac{\mu_S}{s\hbar}\nabla\times(\Psi^* \mathbf{S}\Psi)$$

Hence the probability current (density) is in SI units:
$$\mathbf{j} = \mathbf{j}_e/q = \frac{1}{2m}\left[\left(\Psi^* \mathbf{\hat{p}} \Psi - \Psi \mathbf{\hat{p}} \Psi^*\right) - 2q\mathbf{A} |\Psi|^2 \right] + \frac{\mu_S}{q s\hbar}\nabla\times(\Psi^* \mathbf{S}\Psi)$$

where S is the spin vector of the particle with corresponding spin magnetic moment μ_{S} and spin quantum number s.

It is doubtful if this formula is valid for particles with an interior structure. The neutron has zero charge but non-zero magnetic moment, so $\frac{\mu_S}{q s\hbar}$ would be impossible (except $\nabla \times (\Psi^* \mathbf{S}\Psi)$ would also be zero in this case). For composite particles with a non-zero charge – like the proton which has spin quantum number s=1/2 and μ_{S}= 2.7927·μ_{N} or the deuteron (H-2 nucleus) which has s=1 and μ_{S}=0.8574·μ_{N} – it is mathematically possible but doubtful.

== Connection with classical mechanics ==
The wave function can also be written in the complex exponential (polar) form:
$$\Psi = R e^{i S / \hbar }$$
where R, S are real functions of r and t.

Written this way, the probability density is
$$\rho = \Psi^* \Psi = R^2$$
and the probability current is:
$$\begin{align}
\mathbf{j} & = \frac{\hbar}{2mi}\left(\Psi^{*} \mathbf{\nabla} \Psi - \Psi \mathbf{\nabla}\Psi^{*} \right) \\[5pt]
& = \frac{\hbar}{2mi}\left(R e^{-i S / \hbar} \mathbf{\nabla}R e^{i S / \hbar} - R e^{i S / \hbar} \mathbf{\nabla}R e^{-i S / \hbar}\right) \\[5pt]
& = \frac{\hbar}{2mi}\left[ R e^{-i S / \hbar} \left( e^{i S / \hbar} \mathbf{\nabla}R + \frac{i}{\hbar}R e^{i S / \hbar} \mathbf{\nabla}S \right) - R e^{i S / \hbar} \left( e^{-i S / \hbar} \mathbf{\nabla}R - \frac{i}{\hbar} R e^{-i S / \hbar} \mathbf{\nabla} S \right)\right].
\end{align}$$

The exponentials and R∇R terms cancel:
$$\mathbf{j} = \frac{\hbar}{2mi}\left[\frac {i}{\hbar} R^2 \mathbf{\nabla} S + \frac {i}{\hbar} R^2 \mathbf{\nabla} S \right].$$

Finally, combining and cancelling the constants, and replacing R^{2} with ρ,
$$\mathbf{j} = \rho \frac{\mathbf{\nabla} S}{m}.$$
Hence, the spatial variation of the phase of a wavefunction is said to characterize the probability flux of the wavefunction. If we take the familiar formula for the mass flux in hydrodynamics:
$$\mathbf{j} = \rho \mathbf{v},$$

where $\rho$ is the mass density of the fluid and v is its velocity (also the group velocity of the wave). In the classical limit, we can associate the velocity with $\tfrac{\nabla S}{m},$ which is the same as equating ∇S with the classical momentum p = mv however, it does not represent a physical velocity or momentum at a point since simultaneous measurement of position and velocity violates uncertainty principle. This interpretation fits with Hamilton–Jacobi theory, in which
$$\mathbf{p} = \nabla S$$
in Cartesian coordinates is given by ∇S, where S is Hamilton's principal function.

The de Broglie-Bohm theory equates the velocity with $\tfrac{\nabla S}{m}$ in general (not only in the classical limit) so it is always well defined. It is an interpretation of quantum mechanics.

== Motivation ==
=== Continuity equation for quantum mechanics ===
The definition of probability current and Schrödinger's equation can be used to derive the continuity equation, which has exactly the same forms as those for hydrodynamics and electromagnetism.

For some wave function Ψ, let:

$$\rho(\mathbf{r},t) = |\Psi|^2 = \Psi^*(\mathbf{r},t)\Psi(\mathbf{r},t) .$$
be the probability density (probability per unit volume, * denotes complex conjugate). Then,

$$\begin{align}
\frac{d}{dt}\int_\mathcal{V}dV\, \rho &= \int_\mathcal{V}dV\, \left(\frac {\partial \psi} {\partial t}\psi^*+ \psi \frac {\partial \psi^*} {\partial t}\right) \\
&=\int_\mathcal{V}dV\,\left[-\frac i\hbar\left( -\frac {\hbar^2}{2m}\nabla^2 \psi + V \psi\right)\psi^* + \frac i\hbar\left( -\frac {\hbar^2}{2m}\nabla^2 \psi^* +  V \psi^*\right)\psi\right] \\
&=\int_\mathcal{V}dV\,\frac{i\hbar}{2m} \left[\left(\nabla^2\psi\right) \psi^* - \psi \left(\nabla^2 \psi^*\right)\right]\\
&=\int_\mathcal{V}dV\, \nabla\cdot\left(\frac{i\hbar}{2m}(\psi^*\nabla\psi-\psi\nabla\psi^*)\right)\\
&=\int_\mathcal{S}d\mathbf{a}\cdot\left(\frac{i\hbar}{2m}(\psi^*\nabla\psi-\psi\nabla\psi^*)\right)
\end{align}$$

where V is any volume and S is the boundary of V.

This is the conservation law for probability in quantum mechanics. The integral form is stated as:

$$\int_V \left( \frac{\partial |\Psi|^2}{\partial t} \right) \mathrm{d}V + \int_V \left( \mathbf \nabla \cdot \mathbf j \right) \mathrm{d}V = 0$$
where
$$\mathbf{j} = \frac{1}{2m} \left( \Psi^*\hat{\mathbf{p}}\Psi - \Psi\hat{\mathbf{p}}\Psi^* \right) = -\frac{i\hbar}{2m}(\psi^*\nabla\psi-\psi\nabla\psi^*) = \frac \hbar m \operatorname{Im} (\psi^*\nabla \psi)$$
is the probability current or probability flux (flow per unit area).

Here, equating the terms inside the integral gives the continuity equation for probability:
$$\frac{\partial}{\partial t} \rho\left(\mathbf{r},t\right) + \nabla \cdot \mathbf{j} = 0,$$
and the integral equation can also be restated using the divergence theorem as:

$\frac{\partial}{\partial t} \int_V |\Psi|^2 \mathrm{d}V +$ $\scriptstyle S$ $\mathbf j \cdot \mathrm{d}\mathbf{S} = 0$.

In particular, if Ψ is a wavefunction describing a single particle, the integral in the first term of the preceding equation, sans time derivative, is the probability of obtaining a value within V when the position of the particle is measured. The second term is then the rate at which probability is flowing out of the volume V. Altogether the equation states that the time derivative of the probability of the particle being measured in V is equal to the rate at which probability flows into V.

By taking the limit of volume integral to include all regions of space, a well-behaved wavefunction that goes to zero at infinities in the surface integral term implies that the time derivative of total probability is zero ie. the normalization condition is conserved. This result is in agreement with the unitary nature of time evolution operators which preserve length of the vector by definition.

=== Conserved current for Klein–Gordon fields ===
The probability (4-)current arises from Noether's theorem as applied to the Lagrangian the Klein-Gordon Lagrangian density

$$\mathcal{L}=\partial_\mu\phi^*\,\partial^\mu\phi +V(\phi^*\,\phi)$$
of the complex scalar field $\phi:\mathbb{R}^{n+1}\mapsto\mathbb{C}$. This is invariant under the symmetry transformation
$$\phi\mapsto\phi'=\phi\,e^{i\alpha}\, .$$
Defining $\delta\phi=\phi'-\phi$ we find the Noether current
$$j^\mu:= \frac{d\mathcal{L}}{d \dot{\mathbf{q}}} \cdot \mathbf{Q}_r = \frac{d\mathcal{L}}{d(\partial_\mu \phi)}\,\frac{d(\delta\phi)}{d\alpha}\bigg|_{\alpha=0}+\frac{d\mathcal{L}}{d(\partial_\mu \phi^*)}\,\frac{d(\delta\phi^*)}{d\alpha}\bigg|_{\alpha=0}= i\,\phi\,(\partial^\mu\phi^*)-i\,\phi^*\,(\partial^\mu\phi)$$
which satisfies the continuity equation. Here $\mathbf{Q}_r$ is the generator of the symmetry, which is $\frac{d (\delta \mathbf{q})}{d \alpha_r}$ in the case of a single parameter $\alpha$.

The continuity equation $\partial_\mu j^\mu = 0$ is satisfied. However, note that now, the analog of the probability density is not $\phi \phi^*$ but rather $\phi^* \partial_t \phi - \phi \partial_t \phi^*$. As this quantity can now be negative, we must interpret it as a charge density, with an associated current density and 4-current.

=== Transmission and reflection through potentials ===
In regions where a step potential or potential barrier occurs, the probability current is related to the transmission and reflection coefficients, respectively T and R; they measure the extent the particles reflect from the potential barrier or are transmitted through it. Both satisfy:
$$T + R = 1\,,$$
where T and R can be defined by:
$$T=  \frac{|\mathbf{j}_\mathrm{trans}|}{|\mathbf{j}_\mathrm{inc}|} \, , \quad  R = \frac{|\mathbf{j}_\mathrm{ref}|}{|\mathbf{j}_\mathrm{inc}|} \, ,$$
where j_{inc}, j_{ref}, j_{trans} are the incident, reflected and transmitted probability currents respectively, and the vertical bars indicate the magnitudes of the current vectors. The relation between T and R can be obtained from probability conservation:
$$\mathbf{j}_\mathrm{trans} + \mathbf{j}_\mathrm{ref}=\mathbf{j}_\mathrm{inc}\,.$$

In terms of a unit vector n normal to the barrier, these are equivalently:
$$T= \left|\frac{\mathbf{j}_\mathrm{trans}\cdot\mathbf{n}}{\mathbf{j}_\mathrm{inc}\cdot\mathbf{n}}\right|\,, \qquad R= \left|\frac{\mathbf{j}_\mathrm{ref}\cdot\mathbf{n}}{\mathbf{j}_\mathrm{inc}\cdot\mathbf{n}} \right| \,,$$
where the absolute values are required to prevent T and R being negative.

== Examples ==
=== Plane wave ===
For a plane wave propagating in space:
$$\Psi(\mathbf{r},t) = \, A e^{ i (\mathbf{k}\cdot{\mathbf{r}} - \omega t)}$$
the probability density is constant everywhere;
$$\rho(\mathbf{r},t) = |A|^2 \rightarrow \frac{\partial |\Psi|^2}{\partial t} = 0$$
(that is, plane waves are stationary states) but the probability current is nonzero – the square of the absolute amplitude of the wave times the particle's speed;
$$\mathbf{j}\left(\mathbf{r},t\right) = \left|A\right|^2 {\hbar \mathbf{k} \over m} = \rho \frac{\mathbf{p}}{m} = \rho \mathbf{v}$$

illustrating that the particle may be in motion even if its spatial probability density has no explicit time dependence.

=== Particle in a box ===
For a particle in a box, in one spatial dimension and of length L, confined to the region $0 < x < L$, the energy eigenstates are
$$\Psi_n = \sqrt{\frac{2}{L}} \sin \left( \frac{n\pi}{L} x \right)$$
and zero elsewhere. The associated probability currents are
$$j_n = \frac{i\hbar}{2m}\left( \Psi_n^* \frac{\partial \Psi_n}{\partial x} - \Psi_n \frac{\partial \Psi_n^*}{\partial x} \right) = 0$$
since
$$\Psi_n = \Psi_n^*$$

== Discrete definition ==
For a particle in one dimension on $\ell^2(\Z),$ we have the Hamiltonian $H = -\Delta + V$ where $-\Delta \equiv 2 I - S - S^\ast$ is the discrete Laplacian, with S being the right shift operator on $\ell^2(\Z).$ Then the probability current is defined as $j \equiv 2 \Im\left\{\bar{\Psi} i v \Psi\right\},$ with v the velocity operator, equal to $v \equiv -i[X,\, H]$ and X is the position operator on $\ell^2\left(\mathbb{Z}\right).$ Since V is usually a multiplication operator on $\ell^2(\Z),$ we get to safely write
$$-i[X,\, H] = -i[X,\, -\Delta] = -i\left[X,\, -S - S^{\ast}\right] = i S - i S^{\ast}.$$

As a result, we find:
$$\begin{align}
j\left(x\right) \equiv 2 \Im\left\{\bar{\Psi}(x) i v \Psi(x)\right\}
&= 2 \Im\left\{\bar{\Psi}(x) \left((-S\Psi)(x) + \left(S^\ast \Psi\right)(x)\right)\right\}\\
&= 2 \Im\left\{\bar{\Psi}(x) \left(-\Psi(x-1) + \Psi(x + 1)\right)\right\}
\end{align}$$
