= Electromagnetic four-potential =

Relativistic vector field

An electromagnetic four-potential is a relativistic vector function from which the electromagnetic field can be derived. It combines both an electric scalar potential and a magnetic vector potential into a single four-vector.

As measured in a given frame of reference, and for a given gauge, the first component of the electromagnetic four-potential is conventionally taken to be the electric scalar potential, and the other three components make up the magnetic vector potential. While both the scalar and vector potential depend upon the frame, the electromagnetic four-potential is Lorentz covariant.

Like other potentials, many different electromagnetic four-potentials correspond to the same electromagnetic field, depending upon the choice of gauge.

This article uses tensor index notation and the Minkowski metric sign convention (+ − − −). See also covariance and contravariance of vectors and raising and lowering indices for more details on notation. Formulae are given in SI units and Gaussian-cgs units.

== Definition ==
The contravariant electromagnetic four-potential can be defined as:

SI units	Gaussian units
$A^\alpha = \left( \frac{1}{c}\phi, \mathbf{A} \right)\,\!$	$A^\alpha = (\phi, \mathbf{A})$

in which ϕ is the electric potential, and A is the magnetic potential (a vector potential). The unit of A^{α} is V·s·m^{−1} in SI, and Mx·cm^{−1} in Gaussian-CGS.

The electric and magnetic fields associated with these four-potentials are:

SI units	Gaussian units
$\mathbf{E} = -\mathbf{\nabla} \phi - \frac{\partial \mathbf{A}}{\partial t}$	$\mathbf{E} = -\mathbf{\nabla} \phi - \frac{1}{c} \frac{\partial \mathbf{A}}{\partial t}$
$\mathbf{B} = \mathbf{\nabla} \times \mathbf{A}$	$\mathbf{B} = \mathbf{\nabla} \times \mathbf{A}$

In special relativity, the electric and magnetic fields transform under Lorentz transformations. This can be written in the form of a rank two tensor – the electromagnetic tensor. The 16 contravariant components of the electromagnetic tensor, using Minkowski metric convention (+ − − −), are written in terms of the electromagnetic four-potential and the four-gradient as:

$$F^{\mu\nu} = \partial^{\mu}A^{\nu} - \partial^{\nu}A^{\mu} =
\begin{bmatrix}
0   & -E_x/c & -E_y/c & -E_z/c \\
E_x/c &    0   & -B_z   &  B_y   \\
E_y/c &  B_z   &    0   & -B_x   \\
E_z/c & -B_y   &  B_x   &  0
\end{bmatrix}$$

If the said signature is instead (− + + +) then:

$$F'\,^{\mu\nu} = \partial'\,^{\mu}A^{\nu} - \partial'\,^{\nu}A^{\mu} =
\begin{bmatrix}
0   &  E_x/c &  E_y/c &  E_z/c \\
-E_x/c &    0   &  B_z   & -B_y   \\
-E_y/c & -B_z   &    0   &  B_x   \\
-E_z/c &  B_y   & -B_x   &  0
\end{bmatrix}$$

This essentially defines the four-potential in terms of physically observable quantities, as well as reducing to the above definition.

== In the Lorenz gauge ==
Often, the Lorenz gauge condition $\partial_{\alpha} A^{\alpha} = 0$ in an inertial frame of reference is employed to simplify Maxwell's equations as:

SI units	Gaussian units
$\Box A^\alpha = \mu_0 J^\alpha$	$\Box A^\alpha = \frac{4 \pi}{c} J^\alpha$

where J^{α} are the components of the four-current, and

$$\Box = \frac{1}{c^2} \frac{\partial^2}{\partial t^2} - \nabla^2 = \partial^\alpha \partial_\alpha$$

is the d'Alembertian operator. In terms of the scalar and vector potentials, this last equation becomes:

SI units	Gaussian units
$\Box \phi = \frac{\rho}{\epsilon_0}$	$\Box \phi = 4 \pi \rho$
$\Box \mathbf{A} = \mu_0 \mathbf{j}$	$\Box \mathbf{A} = \frac{4 \pi}{c} \mathbf{j}$

For a given charge and current distribution, ρ(r, t) and j(r, t), the solutions to these equations in SI units are:

$$\begin{align}
\phi (\mathbf{r}, t) &= \frac{1}{4 \pi \epsilon_0} \int \mathrm{d}^3 x^\prime \frac{\rho\left( \mathbf{r}^\prime, t_r\right)}{ \left| \mathbf{r} - \mathbf{r}^\prime \right|} \\
\mathbf A (\mathbf{r}, t) &= \frac{\mu_0}{4 \pi} \int \mathrm{d}^3 x^\prime \frac{\mathbf{j}\left( \mathbf{r}^\prime, t_r\right)}{ \left| \mathbf{r} - \mathbf{r}^\prime \right|},
\end{align}$$

where

$$t_r = t - \frac{\left|\mathbf{r} - \mathbf{r}'\right|}{c}$$

is the retarded time. This is sometimes also expressed with

$$\rho\left(\mathbf{r}', t_r\right) = \left[\rho\left(\mathbf{r}', t\right)\right],$$

where the square brackets are meant to indicate that the time should be evaluated at the retarded time. Of course, since the above equations are simply the solution to an inhomogeneous differential equation, any solution to the homogeneous equation can be added to these to satisfy the boundary conditions. These homogeneous solutions in general represent waves propagating from sources outside the boundary.

When the integrals above are evaluated for typical cases, e.g. of an oscillating current (or charge), they are found to give both a magnetic field component varying according to r^{−2} (the induction field) and a component decreasing as r^{−1} (the radiation field).

== Gauge freedom ==
When flattened to a one-form (in tensor notation, $A_\mu$), the four-potential $A$ (normally written as a vector or, $A^\mu$ in tensor notation) can be decomposed via the Hodge decomposition theorem as the sum of an exact, a coexact, and a harmonic form,

$$A = d \alpha + \delta \beta + \gamma$$.

There is gauge freedom in A in that of the three forms in this decomposition, only the coexact form has any effect on the electromagnetic tensor

$$F = d A$$.

Exact forms are closed, as are harmonic forms over an appropriate domain, so $d d \alpha = 0$ and $d\gamma = 0$, always. So regardless of what $\alpha$ and $\gamma$ are, we are left with simply

$$F = d \delta \beta$$.

In infinite flat Minkowski space, every closed form is exact. Therefore the $\gamma$ term vanishes. Every gauge transform of $A$ can thus be written as

$$A \Rightarrow A + d\alpha$$.

== See also ==
- Aharonov–Bohm effect
- Covariant formulation of classical electromagnetism
- Four-vector
- Gluon field
- Jefimenko's equations
