= Four-current =

4D analogue of electric current density

In special and general relativity, the four-current (technically the four-current density) is the four-dimensional analogue of the current density, with the dimension of electric charge per time per area. Also known as vector current, it is used in the context of four-dimensional spacetime, rather than separating time from three-dimensional space. It is a four-vector and is Lorentz covariant.

This article uses the summation convention for indices. See Covariance and contravariance of vectors for background on raised and lowered indices, and raising and lowering indices on how to translate between them.

== Definition ==
Using the Minkowski metric $\eta_{\mu\nu}$ of metric signature (+ − − −), the four-current components are given by:

$$J^\alpha = \left(c \rho, j^1 , j^2 , j^3 \right) = \left(c \rho, \mathbf{j} \right)$$

where:

- c is the speed of light;
- ρ is the volume charge density;
- j is the conventional current density;
- the dummy index α labels the spacetime dimensions.

=== Motion of charges in spacetime ===
This can also be expressed in terms of the four-velocity by the equation:

$$J^\alpha = \rho_0 U^\alpha ,$$

where:

- $\rho_0$ is "the rest charge density", i.e., the charge density in the rest frame of the charge (as seen by an observer moving along with the local charge).

Qualitatively, the change in charge density (charge per unit volume) is due to the contracted volume of charge due to Lorentz contraction.

=== Physical interpretation ===
Charges (free or as a distribution) at rest will appear to remain at the same spatial position for some interval of time (as long as they're stationary). When they do move, this corresponds to changes in position, therefore the charges have velocity, and the motion of charge constitutes an electric current. This means that charge density is related to time, while current density is related to space.

The four-current unifies charge density (related to electricity) and current density (related to magnetism) in one electromagnetic entity.

== Continuity equation ==
In special relativity, the statement of charge conservation is that the Lorentz invariant divergence of J is zero:

$$\dfrac{\partial J^\alpha}{\partial x^\alpha} = \frac{\partial \rho}{\partial t} + \nabla \cdot \mathbf{j} = 0\,,$$

where $\partial/\partial x^\alpha$ is the four-gradient. This is the continuity equation.

In general relativity, the continuity equation is written as:

$$\nabla_\alpha J^\alpha =0\,,$$

where ∇_{α} is the covariant derivative.

== Maxwell's equations ==
The four-current appears in two equivalent formulations of Maxwell's equations, in terms of the four-potential when the Lorenz gauge condition is fulfilled:

$$\Box A^\alpha = \mu_0 J^\alpha$$

where $\Box$ is the D'Alembert operator, or the electromagnetic field tensor:

$$\nabla_\alpha F^{\alpha\beta} = \mu_0 J^\beta$$

where μ_{0} is the permeability of free space and ∇_{α} is the covariant derivative.

== Quantum field theory ==
The four-current density of charge is an essential component of the Lagrangian density used in quantum electrodynamics. In 1956 Semyon Gershtein and Yakov Zeldovich considered the conserved vector current (CVC) hypothesis for electroweak interactions.

== See also ==
- Four-vector
- Noether's theorem
- Covariant formulation of classical electromagnetism
- Ricci calculus
