= Four-frequency =

Four-vector

The four-frequency of a massless particle, such as a photon, is a four-vector defined by

$$N^a = \left( \nu, \nu \hat{\mathbf{n}} \right)$$

where $\nu$ is the photon's frequency and $\hat{\mathbf{n}}$ is a unit vector in the direction of the photon's motion. The four-frequency of a photon is always a future-pointing and null vector. An observer moving with four-velocity $V^b$ will observe a frequency

$$\frac{1}{c}\eta\left(N^a, V^b\right) = \frac{1}{c}\eta_{ab}N^aV^b$$

Where $\eta$ is the Minkowski inner-product (+−−−) with covariant components $\eta_{ab}$.

Closely related to the four-frequency is the four-wavevector defined by

$$K^a = \left(\frac{\omega}{c}, \mathbf{k}\right)$$

where $\omega = 2 \pi \nu$, $c$ is the speed of light and $\mathbf{k} = \frac{2 \pi}{\lambda}\hat{\mathbf{n}}$ and $\lambda$ is the wavelength of the photon. The four-wavevector is more often used in practice than the four-frequency, but the two vectors are related (using $c = \nu \lambda$) by

$$K^a = \frac{2 \pi}{c} N^a$$

== See also ==
- Four-vector
- Wave vector
