= Lorenz gauge condition =

Gauge fixing of electro magnetic potential

In electromagnetism, the Lorenz gauge condition or Lorenz gauge (after Ludvig Lorenz) is a partial gauge fixing of the electromagnetic vector potential by requiring $\partial_\mu A^\mu = 0$. The name is frequently confused with Hendrik Lorentz, who has given his name to many concepts in this field. The condition is Lorentz invariant. The Lorenz gauge condition does not completely determine the gauge: one can still make a gauge transformation $A^\mu \mapsto A^\mu + \partial^\mu f$, where $\partial^\mu$ is the four-gradient and $f$ is any harmonic scalar function: that is, a scalar function obeying $\partial_\mu\partial^\mu f = 0$, the equation of a massless scalar field.

The Lorenz gauge condition is used to eliminate the redundant spin-0 component in Maxwell's equations when these are used to describe a massless spin-1 quantum field. It is also used for massive spin-1 fields where the concept of gauge transformations does not apply at all.

== Description ==
In electromagnetism, the Lorenz condition is generally used in calculations of time-dependent electromagnetic fields through retarded potentials. The condition is
$$\partial_\mu A^\mu \equiv A^\mu{}_{,\mu} = 0,$$
where $A^\mu$ is the four-potential, the comma denotes a partial differentiation and the repeated index indicates that the Einstein summation convention is being used. The condition has the advantage of being Lorentz invariant. It still leaves substantial gauge degrees of freedom.

In ordinary vector notation and SI units, the condition is
$$\nabla\cdot{\mathbf{A}} + \frac{1}{c^2}\frac{\partial\varphi}{\partial t} = 0,$$
where $\mathbf{A}$ is the magnetic vector potential and $\varphi$ is the electric potential; see also Gauge fixing.

In Gaussian units the condition is
$$\nabla\cdot{\mathbf{A}} + \frac{1}{c}\frac{\partial\varphi}{\partial t} = 0.$$

A quick justification of the Lorenz gauge can be found using Maxwell's equations and the relation between the magnetic vector potential and the magnetic field:
$$\nabla \times \mathbf{E} = -\frac{\partial\mathbf{B}}{\partial t} = - \frac{\partial (\nabla \times \mathbf{A})}{\partial t}$$

Therefore,
$$\nabla \times \left(\mathbf{E} + \frac{\partial\mathbf{A}}{\partial t}\right) = 0.$$

Since the curl is zero, that means there is a scalar function $\varphi$ such that
$$-\nabla\varphi = \mathbf{E} + \frac{\partial\mathbf{A}}{\partial t}.$$

This gives a well known equation for the electric field:
$$\mathbf{E} = -\nabla \varphi - \frac{\partial\mathbf{A}}{\partial t}.$$

This result can be substituted in the Ampère–Maxwell equation,
$$\begin{align}
\nabla \times \mathbf{B} &= \mu_0\mathbf{J} + \frac{1}{c^2}\frac{\partial\mathbf{E}}{\partial t} \\[1ex]
\nabla \times \left(\nabla \times \mathbf{A}\right) &= \mu_0\mathbf{J} + \frac{1}{c^2}\frac{\partial}{\partial t} \left(-\nabla\varphi - \frac{\partial\mathbf{A}}{\partial t}\right) \\[1ex]
\Rightarrow
\nabla\left(\nabla \cdot \mathbf{A}\right) - \nabla^2\mathbf{A} &= \mu_0\mathbf{J} - \frac{1}{c^2}\frac{\partial (\nabla\varphi)}{\partial t} - \frac{1}{c^2}\frac{\partial^2 \mathbf{A}}{\partial t^2}. \\
\end{align}$$

This leaves
$$\nabla\left(\nabla \cdot \mathbf{A} + \frac{1}{c^2}\frac{\partial\varphi}{\partial t}\right) = \mu_0\mathbf{J} - \frac{1}{c^2} \frac{\partial^2 \mathbf{A}}{\partial t^2} + \nabla^2\mathbf{A}.$$

To have Lorentz invariance, the time derivatives and spatial derivatives must be treated equally (i.e. of the same order). Therefore, it is convenient to choose the Lorenz gauge condition, which makes the left hand side zero and gives the result
$$\Box\mathbf{A} = \left[\frac{1}{c^2}\frac{\partial^2}{\partial t^2} - \nabla^2 \right]\mathbf{A} =\mu_0\mathbf{J}.$$

A similar procedure with a focus on the electric scalar potential and making the same gauge choice will yield
$$\Box\varphi = \left[\frac{1}{c^2}\frac{\partial^2}{\partial t^2} - \nabla^2 \right] \varphi = \frac{1}{\varepsilon_0}\rho .$$

These are simpler and more symmetric forms of the inhomogeneous Maxwell's equations.

Here
$$c = \frac{1}{\sqrt{\varepsilon_0\mu_0}}$$
is the vacuum velocity of light, and $\Box$ is the d'Alembertian operator with the (+ − − −) metric signature. These equations are not only valid under vacuum conditions, but also in polarized media, if $\rho$ and $\mathbf{J}$ are source density and circulation density, respectively, of the electromagnetic induction fields $\mathbf{E}$ and $\mathbf{B}$ calculated as usual from $\varphi$ and $\mathbf{A}$ by the equations
$$\begin{align}
\mathbf{E} &= -\nabla\varphi - \frac{\partial \mathbf{A}}{\partial t} \\
\mathbf{B} &= \nabla\times \mathbf{A}
\end{align}$$

The explicit solutions for $\varphi$ and $\mathbf{A}$ – unique, if all quantities vanish sufficiently fast at infinity – are known as retarded potentials.

== History ==
When originally published in 1867, Lorenz's work was not received well by James Clerk Maxwell. Maxwell had eliminated the Coulomb electrostatic force from his derivation of the electromagnetic wave equation since he was working in what would nowadays be termed the Coulomb gauge. The Lorenz gauge hence contradicted Maxwell's original derivation of the EM wave equation by introducing a retardation effect to the Coulomb force and bringing it inside the EM wave equation alongside the time varying electric field, which was introduced in Lorenz's paper "On the identity of the vibrations of light with electrical currents". Lorenz's work was the first use of symmetry to simplify Maxwell's equations after Maxwell himself published his 1865 paper. In 1888, retarded potentials came into general use after Heinrich Rudolf Hertz's experiments on electromagnetic waves. In 1895, a further boost to the theory of retarded potentials came after J. J. Thomson's interpretation of data for electrons (after which investigation into electrical phenomena changed from time-dependent electric charge and electric current distributions over to moving point charges).

Lorenz derived the condition from postulated integral expressions for the potentials (nowadays known as retarded potentials); Lorentz (and before him Emil Wiechert) imposed it to fix the gauge (e.g, in his 1904 Encyclopedia article on electron theory).

== See also ==
- Gauge fixing
- Harmonic coordinate condition

== External links and further reading ==
General

- Weisstein, E. W. "Lorenz Gauge". Wolfram Research.

Further reading

- Lorenz, L. (1867). "On the Identity of the Vibrations of Light with Electrical Currents". Philosophical Magazine. Series 4. 34 (230): 287–301.
- van Bladel, J. (1991). "Lorenz or Lorentz?". IEEE Antennas and Propagation Magazine. 33 (2): 69. doi:10.1109/MAP.1991.5672647. S2CID 21922455.
  - See also Bladel, J. (1991). "Lorenz or Lorentz? [Addendum]". IEEE Antennas and Propagation Magazine. 33 (4): 56. Bibcode:1991IAPM...33...56B. doi:10.1109/MAP.1991.5672657.
- Becker, R. (1982). Electromagnetic Fields and Interactions. Dover Publications. Chapter 3.
- O'Rahilly, A. (1938). Electromagnetics. Longmans, Green and Co. Chapter 6.

History

- Nevels, R.; Shin, Chang-Seok (2001). "Lorenz, Lorentz, and the gauge". IEEE Antennas and Propagation Magazine. 43 (3): 70–71. Bibcode:2001IAPM...43...70N. doi:10.1109/74.934904.
- Whittaker, E. T. (1989). A History of the Theories of Aether and Electricity. Vol. 1–2. Dover Publications. p. 268.
