= D'Alembert operator =

Second-order differential operator

In special relativity, electromagnetism and wave theory, the d'Alembert operator (denoted by a box: $\Box$), also called the d'Alembertian, wave operator, box operator or sometimes quabla operator (cf. nabla symbol) is the Laplace operator of Minkowski space. The operator is named after French mathematician and physicist Jean le Rond d'Alembert, with the box notation being introduced by French mathematician Henri Poincaré in his lectures on electromagnetism.

In Minkowski space, in standard coordinates (t, x, y, z), it has the form

$$\begin{align}
\Box & = \partial^\mu \partial_\mu = \eta^{\mu\nu} \partial_\nu \partial_\mu = \frac{1}{c^{2}} \frac{\partial^2}{\partial t^2} - \frac{\partial^2}{\partial x^2} - \frac{\partial^2}{\partial y^2} - \frac{\partial^2}{\partial z^2} \\
& = \frac{1}{c^2} {\partial^2 \over \partial t^2} - \nabla^2 = \frac{1}{c^2}{\partial^2 \over \partial t^2} - \Delta ~~.
\end{align}$$

Here $\nabla^2 := \Delta$ is the 3-dimensional Laplacian and η^{μν} is the inverse Minkowski metric with

$\eta_{00} = 1$, $\eta_{11} = \eta_{22} = \eta_{33} = -1$, $\eta_{\mu\nu} = 0$ for $\mu \neq \nu$.

Note that the μ and ν summation indices range from 0 to 3: see Einstein notation.

(Some authors alternatively use the negative metric signature of (− + + +), with $\eta_{00} = -1,\; \eta_{11} = \eta_{22} = \eta_{33} = 1$.)

Lorentz transformations leave the Minkowski metric invariant, so the d'Alembertian yields a Lorentz scalar. The above coordinate expressions remain valid for the standard coordinates in every inertial frame.

== The box symbol and alternate notations ==
There are a variety of notations for the d'Alembertian. The most common are the box symbol $\Box$ (Unicode: U+2610 ☐ BALLOT BOX) whose four sides represent the four dimensions of space-time and the box-squared symbol $\Box^2$ which emphasizes the scalar property through the squared term (much like the Laplacian). In keeping with the triangular notation for the Laplacian, sometimes $\Delta_M$ is used.

Another way to write the d'Alembertian in flat standard coordinates is $\partial^2$. This notation is used extensively in quantum field theory, where partial derivatives are usually indexed, so the lack of an index with the squared partial derivative signals the presence of the d'Alembertian.

Sometimes the box symbol is used to represent the four-dimensional Levi-Civita covariant derivative. The symbol $\nabla$ is then used to represent the space derivatives, but this is coordinate-chart-dependent.

== Applications ==
The wave equation for small vibrations is of the form

$$\Box_{c} u\left(x,t\right) \equiv u_{tt} - c^2u_{xx} = 0~,$$

where u(x, t) is the displacement.

The wave equation for the electromagnetic field in vacuum is

$$\Box A^{\mu} = 0$$

where A^{μ} is the electromagnetic four-potential in Lorenz gauge.

The Klein–Gordon equation has the form

$$\left(\Box + \frac{m^2c^2}{\hbar^2}\right) \psi = 0~.$$

== Green's function ==
The Green's function, $G\left(\tilde{x} - \tilde{x}'\right)$, for the d'Alembertian is defined by the equation

$$\Box G\left(\tilde{x} - \tilde{x}'\right) = \delta\left(\tilde{x} - \tilde{x}'\right)$$

where $\delta\left(\tilde{x} - \tilde{x}'\right)$ is the multidimensional Dirac delta function and $\tilde{x}$ and $\tilde{x}'$ are two points in Minkowski space.

A special solution is given by the retarded Green's function which corresponds to signal propagation only forward in time

$$G\left(\vec{r}, t\right) = \frac{1}{4\pi r} \Theta(t) \delta\left(t - \frac{r}{c}\right)$$

where $\Theta$ is the Heaviside step function.

== See also ==
- Four-gradient
- d'Alembert's formula
- Klein–Gordon equation
- Relativistic heat conduction
- Ricci calculus
- Wave equation
