= Lorentz scalar =

Expression in the theory of relativity

In a relativistic theory of physics, a Lorentz scalar is a scalar expression whose value is invariant under any Lorentz transformation. A Lorentz scalar may be generated from, for example, the scalar product of vectors, or by contracting a tensor. While the components of the contracted quantities may change under Lorentz transformations, the Lorentz scalars remain unchanged.

A simple Lorentz scalar in Minkowski spacetime is the spacetime distance ("length" of their difference) of two fixed events in spacetime. While the "position"-4-vectors of the events change between different inertial frames, their spacetime distance remains invariant under the corresponding Lorentz transformation. Other examples of Lorentz scalars are the "length" of a 4-velocity (see below), or the Ricci curvature at a point in spacetime in general relativity, which is a contraction of the Riemann curvature tensor.

== Simple scalars in special relativity ==
=== Length of a position vector ===
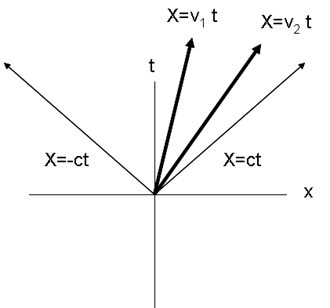
World lines for two particles at different speeds.

In special relativity the location of a particle in 4-dimensional spacetime is given by
$$x^\mu = (ct, \mathbf{x})$$
where $\mathbf{x} = \mathbf{v} t$ is the position in 3-dimensional space of the particle with respect to a reference event, $\mathbf{v}$ is the velocity in 3-dimensional space and $c$ is the speed of light.

The "length" of the vector is a Lorentz scalar and is given by
$$x_{\mu} x^{\mu} = \eta_{\mu \nu} x^{\mu} x^{\nu} = (ct)^2 - \mathbf{x} \cdot \mathbf{x} \ \stackrel{\mathrm{def}}{=}\  (c\tau)^2 ,$$
where $\tau$ is the proper time as measured by a clock in the rest frame of the particle and the Minkowski metric is given by
$$\eta^{\mu\nu} = \eta_{\mu\nu} = \begin{pmatrix}
1 &  0 &  0 &  0 \\
0 & -1 &  0 &  0 \\
0 &  0 & -1 &  0 \\
0 &  0 &  0 & -1
\end{pmatrix}.$$
This is a time-like metric.

Often the Minkowski metric is given on a form in which the overall sign is reversed.
$$\eta^{\mu\nu} = \eta_{\mu\nu} = \begin{pmatrix}
-1 & 0 & 0 & 0 \\
0 & 1 & 0 & 0 \\
0 & 0 & 1 & 0 \\
0 & 0 & 0 & 1
\end{pmatrix}.$$
This is a space-like metric.

In the Minkowski metric the space-like interval $s$ is defined as
$$x_{\mu} x^{\mu} = \eta_{\mu \nu} x^{\mu} x^{\nu} = \mathbf{x} \cdot \mathbf{x} - (ct)^2 \ \stackrel{\mathrm{def}}{=}\  s^2.$$

We use the space-like Minkowski metric in the rest of this article.

=== Length of a velocity vector ===
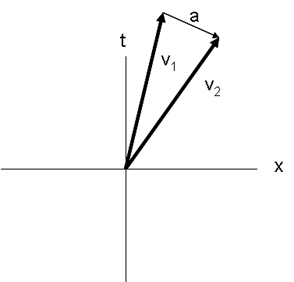
The velocity vectors in spacetime for a particle at two different speeds. In relativity an acceleration is equivalent to a rotation in spacetime.

The velocity in spacetime is defined as
$$v^{\mu} \ \stackrel{\mathrm{def}}{=}\  {dx^{\mu} \over d\tau} = \left( c {dt \over d\tau}, {dt \over d\tau}{d\mathbf{x} \over dt} \right) = \left( \gamma c,  \gamma { \mathbf{v} } \right) = \gamma \left( c, { \mathbf{v} } \right),$$
where
$$\gamma \ \stackrel{\mathrm{def}}{=}\  { 1 \over {\sqrt {1 - { {\mathbf{v} \cdot \mathbf{v}} \over c^2} } } } .$$

The magnitude of the 4-velocity is a Lorentz scalar,
$$v_\mu v^\mu = -c^2\,.$$

Hence, $c$ is a Lorentz scalar.

=== Inner product of acceleration and velocity ===
The 4-acceleration is given by
$$a^{\mu} \ \stackrel{\mathrm{def}}{=}\  {dv^{\mu} \over d\tau}.$$

The 4-acceleration is always perpendicular to the 4-velocity
$$0 = {1 \over 2} {d \over d\tau} \left( v_\mu v^\mu \right) = {d v_\mu \over d\tau} v^\mu = a_\mu v^\mu.$$

Therefore, we can regard acceleration in spacetime as simply a rotation of the 4-velocity. The inner product of the acceleration and the velocity is a Lorentz scalar and is zero. This rotation is simply an expression of energy conservation:
$${d E \over d\tau} = \mathbf{F} \cdot \mathbf{v}$$
where $E$ is the energy of a particle and $\mathbf{F}$ is the 3-force on the particle.

== Energy, rest mass, 3-momentum, and 3-speed from 4-momentum ==
The 4-momentum of a particle is
$$p^\mu = m v^\mu = \left( \gamma m c, \gamma m \mathbf{v} \right) = \left( \gamma m c, \mathbf{p} \right) = \left( \frac E c , \mathbf{p} \right)$$
where $m$ is the particle rest mass, $\mathbf{p}$ is the momentum in 3-space, and
$$E = \gamma m c^2$$
is the energy of the particle.

=== Energy of a particle ===
Consider a second particle with 4-velocity $u$ and a 3-velocity $\mathbf{u}_2$. In the rest frame of the second particle the inner product of $u$ with $p$ is proportional to the energy of the first particle
$$p_\mu u^\mu = - E_1$$
where the subscript 1 indicates the first particle.

Since the relationship is true in the rest frame of the second particle, it is true in any reference frame. $E_1$, the energy of the first particle in the frame of the second particle, is a Lorentz scalar. Therefore,
$$E_1 = \gamma_1 \gamma_2 m_1 c^2 - \gamma_2 \mathbf{p}_1 \cdot \mathbf{u}_2$$
in any inertial reference frame, where $E_1$ is still the energy of the first particle in the frame of the second particle.

=== Rest mass of the particle ===
In the rest frame of the particle the inner product of the momentum is
$$p_\mu p^\mu = -(mc)^2 \,.$$

Therefore, the rest mass (m) is a Lorentz scalar. The relationship remains true independent of the frame in which the inner product is calculated. In many cases the rest mass is written as $m_0$ to avoid confusion with the relativistic mass, which is $\gamma m_0$.

=== 3-momentum of a particle ===
Note that
$$\left( \frac{p_{\mu} u^\mu}{c} \right)^2 + p_{\mu} p^{\mu} = {E_1^2 \over c^2} - (mc)^2 = \left( \gamma_1^2 - 1 \right) (mc)^2 = \gamma_1^2 {\mathbf{v}_1 \cdot \mathbf{v}_1} m^2 = \mathbf{p}_1 \cdot \mathbf{p}_1.$$

The square of the magnitude of the 3-momentum of the particle as measured in the frame of the second particle is a Lorentz scalar.

=== Measurement of the 3-speed of the particle ===
The 3-speed, in the frame of the second particle, can be constructed from two Lorentz scalars
$$v_1^2 = \mathbf{v}_1 \cdot \mathbf{v}_1 = \frac { \mathbf{p}_1 \cdot \mathbf{p}_1 } { E_1^2 } c^4.$$

== More complicated scalars ==
Scalars may also be constructed from the tensors and vectors, from the contraction of tensors (such as $F_{\mu\nu}F^{\mu\nu}$), or combinations of contractions of tensors and vectors (such as $g_{\mu\nu}x^{\mu}x^{\nu}$).
