= Foldy =

Foldy or Földy is a surname. Notable people with the surname include:

- László Földy (1934–2015) Hungarian and Swiss international table tennis player
- Leslie Lawrance Foldy (1919–2001), theoretical physicist
- Peter Foldy (fl. 1973), Hungarian-born recording artist, film producer, director and screenwriter

== Fictional characters ==
- Foldy, a character from the fourth season of Battle for Dream Island, an animated web series

== See also ==
- Földi
- Foldy–Wouthuysen transformation
