= Theodore Newton =

Theodore Newton may refer to:

- Theodore Newton (actor) (1904–1963)
- Theodore Duddell Newton, see Newton–Wigner localization

== See also ==
- Ted Newton, Beethoven character
- Teddy Newton, artist
