= Gordon decomposition =

Mathematical physics equation tied to the Dirac current

In mathematical physics, the Gordon decomposition (named after Walter Gordon) of the Dirac current is a splitting of the charge or particle-number current into a part that arises from the motion of the center of mass of the particles and a part that arises from gradients of the spin density. It makes explicit use of the Dirac equation and so it applies only to "on-shell" solutions of the Dirac equation.

== Original statement ==
For any solution $\psi$ of the massive Dirac equation,

$$(i\gamma^\mu \nabla_\mu-m)\psi=0,$$

the Lorentz covariant number-current $j^\mu=\bar\psi \gamma^\mu\psi$ may be expressed as

$$\bar\psi \gamma^\mu\psi =\frac{i}{2m} (\bar \psi \nabla^\mu\psi -(\nabla^\mu\bar \psi) \psi)+\frac{1}{m} \partial_\nu(\bar\psi \Sigma^{\mu\nu}\psi),$$

where

$$\Sigma^{\mu\nu} = \frac {i}{4} [\gamma^\mu,\gamma^\nu]$$

is the spinor generator of Lorentz transformations, and

$$\bar\psi = \psi^\dagger \gamma^0$$

is the Dirac adjoint.

The corresponding momentum-space version for plane wave solutions $u(p)$ and $\bar u(p')$ obeying

$$(\gamma^\mu p_\mu -m)u(p)=0$$
$$\bar u(p') (\gamma^\mu p'_\mu -m)=0,$$

is

$$\bar u(p') \gamma^\mu u(p)=\bar u(p') \left[\frac{(p+p')^\mu}{2m} +i \sigma^{\mu\nu}\frac{(p'-p)_\nu}{2m}\right]u(p) ~,$$

where

$$\sigma^{\mu\nu} = 2\Sigma^{\mu\nu}.$$

=== Proof ===
One sees that from Dirac's equation that

$$\bar\psi \gamma^\mu (m \psi) = \bar\psi \gamma^\mu (i\gamma^\nu \nabla_\nu\psi)$$

and, from the adjoint of Dirac's equation,

$$(\bar\psi m )\gamma^\mu \psi = ((\nabla_\nu \bar\psi)(-i\gamma^\nu))\gamma^\mu\psi  .$$

Adding these two equations yields

$$\bar\psi \gamma^\mu \psi =
\frac{i}{2m}(\bar\psi \gamma^\mu \gamma^\nu \nabla_\nu\psi -(\nabla_\nu\bar\psi) \gamma^\nu \gamma^\mu\psi) .$$

From Dirac algebra, one may show that Dirac matrices satisfy

$$\gamma^\mu \gamma^\nu = \eta^{\mu\nu} - i\sigma^{\mu\nu}= \eta^{\nu\mu} + i\sigma^{\nu\mu}.$$

Using this relation,

$$\bar\psi \gamma^\mu \psi =
\frac{i}{2m}(\bar\psi (\eta^{\mu\nu} - i\sigma^{\mu\nu})\nabla_\nu\psi -(\nabla_\nu\bar\psi)(\eta^{\mu\nu} + i\sigma^{\mu\nu})\psi),$$

which amounts to just the Gordon decomposition, after some algebra.

=== Utility ===
The second, spin-dependent, part of the current coupled to the photon field, $-A_\mu j^\mu$ yields, up to an ignorable total divergence,

$$-\frac{e\hbar}{2mc}\partial_\nu A_\mu \bar{\psi} \sigma^{\nu\mu}\psi=  -\frac{e\hbar}{2mc}\tfrac{1}{2}F_{\mu\nu} \bar{\psi} \sigma^{\mu\nu}\psi  ,$$

that is, an effective Pauli moment term, $-(e\hbar/2mc) \vec{B} \cdot \psi^\dagger \vec \sigma \psi$.

== Massless generalization ==
This decomposition of the current into a particle number-flux (first term) and bound spin contribution (second term) requires $m\ne 0$.

If one assumed that the given solution has energy $E= \sqrt{|{\mathbf k}|^2+m^2}$ so that $\psi(\mathbf r,t) = \psi({\mathbf r}) e^{-iEt}$, one might obtain a decomposition that is valid for both massive and massless cases.

Using the Dirac equation again, one finds that

$${\mathbf j}\equiv e\bar \psi {\boldsymbol \gamma} \psi = \frac{e}{2iE} \left(\psi^\dagger \nabla \psi - (\nabla \psi^\dagger)\psi\right) +\frac{e}{E} (\nabla \times{\mathbf S}).$$

Here ${\boldsymbol \gamma}= (\gamma^1,\gamma^2,\gamma^3)$, and ${\mathbf S} =\psi^\dagger \hat {\mathbf S}\psi$ with $(\hat S_x,\hat S_y,\hat S_z)= (\Sigma^{23},\Sigma^{31},\Sigma^{12}),$ so that

$$\hat {\mathbf S}=\frac 12 \left[\begin{matrix}{\boldsymbol \sigma}&0 \\ 0 &{\boldsymbol \sigma}\end{matrix}\right],$$

where ${\boldsymbol \sigma}=(\sigma_x,\sigma_y,\sigma_z)$ is the vector of Pauli matrices.

With the particle-number density identified with $\rho= \psi^\dagger\psi$, and for a near plane-wave solution of finite extent, one may interpret the first term in the decomposition as the current ${\mathbf j}_{\rm free}= e\rho {\mathbf k}/E= e\rho {\mathbf v}$, due to particles moving at speed ${\mathbf v}={\mathbf k}/E$.

The second term, ${\mathbf j}_{\rm bound}= (e/E)\nabla\times {\mathbf S}$ is the current due to the gradients in the intrinsic magnetic moment density. The magnetic moment itself is found by integrating by parts to show that

$${\boldsymbol \mu}\stackrel{\rm }{=} \frac{1}{2}\int {\mathbf r}\times {\mathbf j}_{\rm bound}\,d^3x =\frac{1}{2}\int {\mathbf r}\times \left(\frac e E\nabla \times {\mathbf S}\right)\,d^3 x = \frac{e}{E}\int {\mathbf S}\,d^3 x  ~.$$

For a single massive particle in its rest frame, where $E=m$, the magnetic moment reduces to

$${\boldsymbol \mu}_{\rm Dirac}=\left( \frac{e}{m}\right){\mathbf S}= \left(\frac{e g}{2m}\right) {\mathbf S}.$$

where $|{\mathbf S}|=\hbar/2$ and $g=2$ is the Dirac value of the gyromagnetic ratio.

For a single massless particle obeying the right-handed Weyl equation, the spin-1/2 is locked to the direction $\hat {\mathbf k}$ of its kinetic momentum and the magnetic moment becomes

$${\boldsymbol \mu}_{\rm Weyl}=\left( \frac{e}{E}\right) \frac{\hbar \hat {\mathbf k}}{2}.$$

== Angular momentum density ==
For both the massive and massless cases, one also has an expression for the momentum density as part of the symmetric Belinfante–Rosenfeld stress–energy tensor

$$T^{\mu\nu}_{\rm BR}= \frac{i}{4}(\bar \psi \gamma^\mu \nabla^\nu \psi - (\nabla^\nu \bar\psi) \gamma^\mu\psi +\bar \psi \gamma^\nu \nabla^\mu \psi-(\nabla^\mu \bar\psi) \gamma^\nu\psi).$$

Using the Dirac equation one may evaluate $T^{0\mu}_{\rm BR}=({\mathcal E},{\mathbf P})$ to find the energy density to be ${\mathcal E}=E\psi^\dagger \psi$, and the momentum density,

$${\mathbf P}= \frac 1{2i}\left (\psi^\dagger (\nabla \psi)- (\nabla \psi^\dagger)\psi\right) +\frac 12 \nabla\times {\mathbf S}.$$

If one used the non-symmetric canonical energy-momentum tensor

$$T^{\mu\nu}_{\rm canonical}= \frac{i}{2}(\bar \psi \gamma^\mu \nabla^\nu \psi - (\nabla^\nu \bar\psi) \gamma^\mu\psi),$$

one would not find the bound spin-momentum contribution.

By an integration by parts one finds that the spin contribution to the total angular momentum is

$$\int {\mathbf r}\times\left(\frac 12 \nabla\times {\mathbf S}\right)\,d^3x = \int {\mathbf S}\, d^3x.$$

This is what is expected, so the division by 2 in the spin contribution to the momentum density is necessary. The absence of a division by 2 in the formula for the current reflects the $g=2$ gyromagnetic ratio of the electron. In other words, a spin-density gradient is twice as effective at making an electric current as it is at contributing to the linear momentum.

== Spin in Maxwell's equations ==
Motivated by the Riemann–Silberstein vector form of Maxwell's equations, Michael Berry uses the Gordon strategy to obtain gauge-invariant expressions for the intrinsic spin angular-momentum density for solutions to Maxwell's equations.

He assumes that the solutions are monochromatic and uses the phasor expressions $\mathbf E = \mathbf E(\mathbf r) e^{-i\omega t}$, $\mathbf H = \mathbf H(\mathbf r) e^{-i\omega t}$. The time average of the Poynting vector momentum density is then given by
$$\begin{align}
\langle \mathbf P \rangle &=\frac 1{4c^2} [{\mathbf E}^*\times {\mathbf H}+ {\mathbf E}\times {\mathbf H}^*] \\
&= \frac{\epsilon_0}{4i\omega }[{\mathbf E}^*\cdot(\nabla {\mathbf E})- (\nabla {\mathbf E}^*)\cdot{\mathbf E} +\nabla\times({\mathbf E}^*\times {\mathbf E})] \\
&= \frac{\mu_0}{4i \omega }[{\mathbf H}^*\cdot(\nabla {\mathbf H})- (\nabla {\mathbf H}^*)\cdot{\mathbf H} +
\nabla\times({\mathbf H}^*\times {\mathbf H})].
\end{align}$$
We have used Maxwell's equations in passing from the first to the second and third lines, and in expression such as ${\mathbf H}^*\cdot(\nabla {\mathbf H})$ the scalar product is between the fields so that the vector character is determined by the $\nabla$.

As
$$\mathbf P_\text{tot} = \mathbf P_\text{free} + {\mathbf P}_\text{bound},$$
and for a fluid with intrinsic angular momentum density $\mathbf S$ we have
$$\mathbf P_\text{bound} = \frac 1 2 \nabla\times \mathbf S,$$
these identities suggest that the spin density can be identified as either
$$\mathbf S = \frac{\mu_0}{2i \omega } {\mathbf H}^*\times {\mathbf H}$$
or
$$\mathbf S = \frac{\epsilon_0}{2i \omega }{\mathbf E}^*\times {\mathbf E}.$$
The two decompositions coincide when the field is paraxial. They also coincide when the field is a pure helicity state – i.e. when ${\mathbf E}=i\sigma c {\mathbf B}$ where the helicity $\sigma$ takes the values $\pm 1$ for light that is right or left circularly polarized respectively. In other cases they may differ.
