= Feynman checkerboard =

Fermion path integral approach in 1+1 dimensions

Feynman checkerboard with two paths contributing to the sum for the propagator from ($x/\epsilon c$, $t/\epsilon$) = (0, 0) to (3, 7)

The Feynman checkerboard, or relativistic chessboard model, was Richard Feynman's sum-over-paths formulation of the kernel for a free spin-1/2 particle moving in one spatial dimension. It provides a representation of solutions of the Dirac equation in (1+1)-dimensional spacetime as discrete sums.

The model can be visualised by considering relativistic random walks on a two-dimensional spacetime checkerboard. At each discrete timestep $\epsilon$ the particle of mass $m$ moves a distance $\epsilon c$ to the left or right ($c$ being the speed of light). For such a discrete motion, the Feynman path integral reduces to a sum over the possible paths. Feynman demonstrated that if each "turn" (change of moving from left to right or conversely) of the space–time path is weighted by $-i \epsilon mc^2/\hbar$ (with $\hbar$ denoting the reduced Planck constant), in the limit of infinitely small checkerboard squares the sum of all weighted paths yields a propagator that satisfies the one-dimensional Dirac equation. As a result, helicity (the one-dimensional equivalent of spin) is obtained from a simple cellular-automata-type rule.

The checkerboard model is important because it connects aspects of spin and chirality with propagation in spacetime and is the only sum-over-path formulation in which quantum phase is discrete at the level of the paths, taking only values corresponding to the 4th roots of unity.

== History ==
Richard Feynman invented the model in the 1940s while developing his spacetime approach to quantum mechanics. He did not publish the result until it appeared in a text on path integrals coauthored by Albert Hibbs in the mid 1960s. The model was not included with the original path-integral article because a suitable generalization to a four-dimensional spacetime had not been found.

One of the first connections between the amplitudes prescribed by Feynman for the Dirac particle in 1+1 dimensions, and the standard interpretation of amplitudes in terms of the kernel, or propagator, was established by Jayant Narlikar in a detailed analysis. The name "Feynman chessboard model" was coined by Harold A. Gersch when he demonstrated its relationship to the one-dimensional Ising model. B. Gaveau et al. discovered a relationship between the model and a stochastic model of the telegraph equations due to Mark Kac through analytic continuation. Ted Jacobson and Lawrence Schulman examined the passage from the relativistic to the non-relativistic path integral. Subsequently, G. N. Ord showed that the chessboard model was embedded in correlations in Kac's original stochastic model and so had a purely classical context, free of formal analytic continuation. In the same year, Louis Kauffman and Pierres Noyes produced a fully discrete version related to bit-string physics, which has been developed into a general approach to discrete physics.

== Extensions ==
Although Feynman did not live to publish extensions to the chessboard model, it is evident from his archived notes that he was interested in establishing a link between the 4th roots of unity (used as statistical weights in chessboard paths) and his discovery, with John Archibald Wheeler, that antiparticles are equivalent to particles moving backwards in time. His notes contain several sketches of chessboard paths with added spacetime loops. The first extension of the model to explicitly contain such loops was the "spiral model", in which chessboard paths were allowed to spiral in spacetime. Unlike the chessboard case, causality had to be implemented explicitly to avoid divergences, however with this restriction the Dirac equation emerged as a continuum limit. Subsequently, the roles of zitterbewegung, antiparticles and the Dirac sea in the chessboard model have been elucidated, and the implications for the Schrödinger equation considered through the non-relativistic limit.

Further extensions of the original 2-dimensional spacetime model include features such as improved summation rules and generalized lattices. There has been no consensus on an optimal extension of the chessboard model to a fully four-dimensional spacetime. Two distinct classes of extensions exist, those working with a fixed underlying lattice and those that embed the two-dimensional case in higher dimension. The advantage of the former is that the sum-over-paths is closer to the non-relativistic case, however the simple picture of a single directionally independent speed of light is lost. In the latter extensions the fixed-speed property is maintained at the expense of variable directions at each step.
