= Földi =

Földi or Foldi is a Hungarian surname. Notable people with the surname include:

- Andrew Földi (1926–2007), Hungarian-American singer
- Ernő Földi, Hungarian table tennis player
- Imre Földi (1938–2017), Hungarian weightlifter
- László Földi (1919–2001), Hungarian physicist
- László Földi (politician) (born 1952), Hungarian politician

== See also ==
- Foldy–Wouthuysen transformation, in physics, a unitary transformation
- Földes, Hungarian town
