= William Rarita =

William Rarità
- Born: March 21, 1907; Bordeaux, France
- Died: July 3, 1999 (aged 92); Berkeley, California
- Known for: Rarita–Schwinger equation
- Scientific career
- Fields: Theoretical Physics

William Rarità (March 21, 1907 – July 8, 1999) was an American theoretical physicist who mainly worked on nuclear physics, particle physics and relativistic quantum mechanics. He is particularly famous for the formulation of Rarita–Schwinger equation. His famous formula is applicable to spin 3/2 particles as opposed to spin 1/2 particles. Rarita taught physics at Brooklyn College for 32 years before he became a visiting scientist in the theory group at LBNL. At the time of his retirement in 1996, he was doing research at LBNL. In addition to his work with Julian Schwinger, Rarita also collaborated with Herman Feshbach.

Rarita spent a year at the European Organization for Nuclear Research (CERN) in Geneva, Switzerland.
