= Walter Gordon (physicist) =

German theoretical physicist

- Born: 13 August 1893; Apolda, Saxe-Weimar-Eisenach, German Empire
- Died: 24 December 1939 (aged 46); Stockholm, Sweden
- Education: Humboldt University of Berlin; University of Hamburg
- Known for: Gordon decomposition Optical metric Klein–Gordon equation
- Scientific career
- Fields: Theoretical physics
- Workplaces: Humboldt University of Berlin; University of Manchester; University of Hamburg; Kaiser Wilhelm Society; Stockholm University
- Doctoral advisor: Max Planck

Walter Gordon (13 August 1893 – 24 December 1939) was a German theoretical physicist.

== Life ==
Walter Gordon was born in Apolda into a Jewish family. He was the son of businessman Arnold Gordon, originally from Oppeln, and his wife Bianca Gordon (née Brann), from Breslau. The family moved to Switzerland in his early years. In 1900, he attended school in St. Gallen and in 1915 he began his studies of mathematics and physics at University of Berlin. He received his doctoral degree in 1921 under Max Planck. In 1922, while still at the University of Berlin, Gordon became the assistant of Max von Laue. In 1925, he worked for some months in Manchester with William Lawrence Bragg, and later at the Kaiser Wilhelm Institute for Fibre Chemistry in Berlin-Dahlem.

In 1926, he moved to the University of Hamburg, where he attained the habilitation in 1929. In 1930, he was appointed außerordentlicher Professor (extraordinary professor). In 1932, he married Gertrud Lobbenberg (born 1906), the daughter of Hamburg merchant Jos. Lobbenberg (1865–1936) and Johanna Katz; the couple had no children.

After the Nazi seizure of power, Gordon's teaching licence was revoked effective 1 September 1933 under the Law for the Restoration of the Professional Civil Service. That year he emigrated to Stockholm, where he worked at the university's institute for mechanics and mathematical physics until his death.

He died on 24 December 1939 of stomach cancer.

== Notable works ==
Oskar Klein, Walter Gordon, and Vladimir Fock independently and almost simultaneously proposed the Klein–Gordon equation to describe quantum particles in the framework of relativity. Another important contribution by Gordon was to the theory of the Dirac equation, where he introduced the Gordon decomposition of the current into its center of mass and spin contributions, and so helped explain the $g=2$ g-factor value in the electron's gyromagnetic ratio.
