= Rarita–Schwinger equation =

Field equation for spin-3/2 fermions

In theoretical physics, the Rarita–Schwinger equation is the relativistic field equation for spin-3/2 fermions. It is the spin-3/2 analogue of the Dirac equation for spin-1/2 fermions. The equation was introduced by William Rarita and Julian Schwinger in 1941.

The Rarita–Schwinger field is a vector-valued spinor, usually denoted $\psi_\mu$. In four dimensions it transforms as the tensor product of a Lorentz vector and a Dirac spinor, (1/2, 1/2) ⊗ ((1/2, 0) ⊕ (0, 1/2)), and the spin-3/2 part is contained in the (1, 1/2) ⊕ (1/2, 1) representation. The field therefore contains lower-spin components, which must be removed by constraints.

In modern four-component notation the massive free equation may be written as

$$\left(\epsilon^{\mu\kappa\rho\nu}\gamma_5\gamma_\kappa\partial_\rho
- i m \sigma^{\mu\nu}\right)\psi_\nu = 0,$$

where $\epsilon^{\mu\kappa\rho\nu}$ is the Levi-Civita symbol, $\gamma_\kappa$ are the Dirac matrices, $\gamma_5=i\gamma_0\gamma_1\gamma_2\gamma_3$, $m$ is the mass, and

$$\sigma^{\mu\nu}\equiv {i\over 2}[\gamma^\mu,\gamma^\nu].$$

The equation follows from the Rarita–Schwinger Lagrangian

$$\mathcal L
= -{1\over 2}\bar\psi_\mu
\left(\epsilon^{\mu\kappa\rho\nu}\gamma_5\gamma_\kappa\partial_\rho
- i m \sigma^{\mu\nu}\right)\psi_\nu ,$$

where the bar denotes the Dirac adjoint.

The Rarita–Schwinger equation is the standard relativistic field equation for the gravitino, the spin-3/2 gauge field of supergravity. In four-dimensional $\mathcal N=1$ supergravity the gravitino may be written as a Weyl vector-spinor, or equivalently as a Majorana Rarita–Schwinger field. When supersymmetry is spontaneously broken, the super-Higgs mechanism gives the gravitino a Majorana mass. In extended supergravity there can be several gravitini; for example, in broken $\mathcal N=2$ supergravity two Majorana gravitini may be organized as a Dirac gravitino if an appropriate residual symmetry is present.

== Massless equation and gauge invariance ==
A massless Rarita–Schwinger field may be described by the Lagrangian density

$$\mathcal L_{RS}=\bar\psi_\mu \gamma^{\mu\nu\rho}\partial_\nu\psi_\rho,$$

where

$$\gamma^{\mu\nu\rho}\equiv \gamma^{[\mu}\gamma^\nu\gamma^{\rho]}$$

is the antisymmetrized product of gamma matrices. The corresponding equation of motion is

$$\gamma^{\mu\nu\rho}\partial_\nu\psi_\rho=0.$$

The massless equation has the fermionic gauge invariance

$$\psi_\mu \rightarrow \psi_\mu+\partial_\mu\epsilon,$$

where $\epsilon$ is an arbitrary spinor field. This gauge invariance removes the unphysical spin-1/2 components of the vector-spinor. In supergravity this gauge invariance is the spin-3/2 part of local supersymmetry, and the Rarita–Schwinger field is the gravitino.

Using this gauge invariance, one may impose the gamma-traceless gauge

$$\gamma^\mu\psi_\mu=0.$$

Together with the equation of motion, this gives the transverse and Dirac-type conditions

$$\gamma^\nu\partial_\nu\psi_\mu=0,\qquad
\partial^\mu\psi_\mu=0,\qquad
\gamma^\mu\psi_\mu=0.$$

These equations describe the two helicity states of a massless spin-3/2 field.

== Massive field and constraints ==
A massive spin-3/2 particle in four dimensions has

$$2s+1=4$$

physical degrees of freedom. The vector-spinor $\psi_\mu$, however, contains more components. A consistent massive Rarita–Schwinger system must therefore imply subsidiary conditions that remove the lower-spin sector.

For the free massive theory, the equation of motion implies the constraints

$$\gamma^\mu\psi_\mu=0,\qquad
\partial^\mu\psi_\mu=0,$$

together with the Dirac equation acting on each vector component,

$$(\gamma^\nu\partial_\nu+m)\psi_\mu=0$$

up to convention-dependent factors of $i$. These constraints are the spin-3/2 analogue of the Fierz–Pauli subsidiary conditions for higher-spin fields.

== Interactions and the Velo–Zwanziger problem ==
The question of coupling higher-spin particles to external fields goes back at least to Dirac's 1936 work on relativistic wave equations for particles of arbitrary spin. Dirac emphasized that such equations might be useful either for future elementary particles with spin greater than one half, or as approximate equations for composite particles. For spin $3/2$, this problem is subtle because the vector-spinor field contains unphysical spin-1/2 components. A consistent interacting equation must propagate the constraints that remove these components, rather than turning them into additional degrees of freedom.

In four-component notation the vector-spinor is denoted $\psi_\mu$. Equivalently, in two-component notation one may write it as a pair of Weyl vector-spinors,

$$\psi_\mu =
\begin{pmatrix}
\chi_{\mu\alpha} \\
\bar\lambda_\mu{}^{\dot\alpha}
\end{pmatrix}.$$

The spin-3/2 constraints are then the two-component form of the gamma-trace condition:

$$\bar\sigma^\mu\chi_\mu=0,\qquad
\sigma^\mu\bar\lambda_\mu=0.$$

Together with the corresponding divergence constraints, these remove the lower-spin sector and leave the four physical polarizations of a massive spin-3/2 particle.

For a charged field, the simplest attempt is the minimal substitution

$$\partial_\mu\rightarrow D_\mu=\partial_\mu-i e A_\mu .$$

Johnson and Sudarshan found an inconsistency in the canonical quantization of the minimally coupled spin-3/2 field, and Velo and Zwanziger showed that the corresponding classical equations in an external electromagnetic background can have pathological characteristic surfaces. The problem may appear either as superluminal propagation or as the loss of a constraint, leading to the propagation of an unphysical number of modes.

A useful way to state the Velo–Zwanziger problem is therefore the following: one must find interacting equations of motion whose constraint chain closes in the electromagnetic background. In other words, the primary spin-3/2 conditions, such as $\gamma^\mu\psi_\mu=0$, must imply consistent secondary divergence constraints, and these constraints must be preserved by the equations of motion.

Non-minimal electromagnetic couplings can restore this closure in special backgrounds. In a constant electromagnetic field, a point-particle Fierz–Pauli system for a massive charged spin-3/2 field may be written as

$$i\bar\sigma^n D_n\chi_m+M\bar\lambda_m=0,$$
$$i\sigma^n D_n\bar\lambda_m+M\chi_m
=-\,i{2e\over M}F_{mn}\chi^n,$$

together with

$$\bar\sigma^m\chi_m=0,\qquad
\sigma^m\bar\lambda_m=0.$$

Taking traces and divergences of these equations gives a closed Fierz–Pauli constraint chain in the constant-field background. The non-minimal Pauli term is essential, and the corresponding point-particle gyromagnetic ratio is

$$g=2.$$

The value $g=2$ is not universal for composite spin-3/2 particles: the Ω^{−} baryon, for example, has a measured magnetic moment corresponding to a gyromagnetic ratio different from 2. Such cases can be described by effective equations of motion, valid in weak electromagnetic backgrounds, in which the constraint chain is maintained perturbatively.

Supergravity gives another special realization of interacting spin-3/2 fields, namely the gravitino. It should not be regarded as a general solution of the massive charged Rarita–Schwinger problem, because in supergravity the gravitino mass, charge and gravitational coupling are not independent parameters.

== Sources ==
- Weinberg, Steven (1995). The Quantum Theory of Fields. Vol. 1. Cambridge University Press.
- Weinberg, Steven (2000). The Quantum Theory of Fields. Vol. 3. Cambridge University Press.
- Collins, P. D. B.; Martin, A. D.; Squires, E. J. (1989). Particle Physics and Cosmology. Wiley.
