= Siegfried Adolf Wouthuysen =

Dutch physicist (1916–1996)

Siegfried Adolf Wouthuysen (17 August 1916 – 14 July 1996) was a Dutch physicist who made contributions to quantum mechanics. He collaborated with Leslie Lawrance Foldy to develop the Foldy–Wouthuysen transformation, and with George B. Field to develop the Wouthuysen–Field coupling.

== Early life ==
Wouthuysen was born in Amsterdam in 1916. He obtained his bachelor's degree in Chemistry at Ghent University in 1936 and his master's degree in Mathematics and Physics at Leiden University in 1939.

== Research ==
Wouthuysen gained his Ph.D. from the University of California, Berkeley, 1948 with a dissertation on self-energy and relativistic covariance in field theory, under his advisor J. Robert Oppenheimer. In 1949 he became assistant professor and in 1955 full professor of Physics at the University of Amsterdam, which position he held until his retirement in 1984.
