= Leslie Lawrance Foldy =

Leslie Lawrance Foldy (1919–2001) was a theoretical physicist, who made contributions to condensed matter physics and quantum mechanics.

== Early life ==
Foldy was born László Földi in Kisszeben, Hungary (today Slovakia), on October 26, 1919. In 1920, his family moved to the USA due to the invasion of Hungary around that time, and there he was known as Leslie Foldy.

== Education ==
His high school education was in Cleveland, Ohio, and at that time he called his middle name "Lawrance", upon noticing he hadn't a middle name while the other students had. While at high school, he picked up an interest in physics. In 1941, Foldy graduated with a B.S. degree in physics from the Case School of Applied Science (now renamed to the Case Western Reserve University), his senior thesis was on crystal lattice vibrations.

== Research ==
He started his PHD in 1945 at the University of California, Berkeley, in J. Robert Oppenheimer's group, and with Luis Alvarez and David Bohm, until 1947. In 1948 he completed his doctoral degree at the Institute for Advanced Study, and later returned to the Case Institute of Technology as an assistant professor of physics.

In 1949 at the University of Rochester, Foldy and Siegfried Adolf Wouthuysen, working with Robert Marshak, wrote a preprint on the nonrelativistic limit of the Dirac equation. In 1950 at Michigan, their work was criticized as erroneous, motivating Foldy and Wouthuysen to make their calculations clear and efficient. A transformation forming part of their calculations is now called the Foldy–Wouthuysen transformation.

Positions he held at the Institute for Advanced Study include:

- Fulbright Fellow, 1953–54
- Guggenheim Fellow, 1953–54
- NSF Sr Postdoc Fellow, 1963–64
