= Newton–Wigner localization =

Scheme for obtaining the position operator

In quantum field theory, Newton–Wigner localization is a scheme for obtaining a position operator for massive relativistic quantum particles. It is named after Theodore Duddell Newton and Eugene Wigner, who first discussed it in 1949.

The Newton–Wigner concept was developed for elementary systems, an abstraction similar to elementary particles but without the requirement of non-decomposability. For example, a hydrogen atom is an elementary system but not an elementary particle, while an electron is both.

In the relativistic quantum mechanics of a single particle, the Newton–Wigner position operators x_{1}, x_{2}, x_{3} have the same commutation relations with the 3 space momentum operators and transform under rotations in the same way as the x, y, z in ordinary quantum mechanics. Though formally they have the same properties with respect to p_{1}, p_{2}, p_{3}, as the position in ordinary quantum mechanics, they have additional properties: One of these is that

$$[x_i \, , p_0 ] = p_i/p_0 ~.$$

This ensures that the free particle moves at the expected velocity with the given momentum/energy.

In 1950, Foldy and Wouthuysen used the Newton-Wigner results to develop their Foldy-Wouthuysen transformation, a particular transformation which yields position and velocity operators similar to classical physics and separates the spin and orbital angular momentum operators.
