= Dirac adjoint =

Dual to the Dirac spinor

In quantum field theory, the Dirac adjoint defines the dual operation of a Dirac spinor. The Dirac adjoint is motivated by the need to form well-behaved, measurable quantities out of Dirac spinors, replacing the usual role of the Hermitian adjoint.

Possibly to avoid confusion with the usual Hermitian adjoint, some textbooks do not provide a name for the Dirac adjoint but simply call it "ψ-bar".

== Definition ==
Let $\psi$ be a Dirac spinor. Then its Dirac adjoint is defined as

$$\bar\psi \equiv \psi^\dagger \gamma^0$$

where $\psi^\dagger$ denotes the Hermitian adjoint of the spinor $\psi$, and $\gamma^0$ is the time-like gamma matrix.

== Spinors under Lorentz transformations ==
The Lorentz group of special relativity is not compact, therefore spinor representations of Lorentz transformations are generally not unitary. That is, if $\lambda$ is a projective representation of some Lorentz transformation,

$$\psi \mapsto \lambda \psi,$$

then, in general,

$$\lambda^\dagger \ne \lambda^{-1}.$$

The Hermitian adjoint of a spinor transforms according to

$$\psi^\dagger \mapsto \psi^\dagger \lambda^\dagger.$$

Therefore, $\psi^\dagger\psi$ is not a Lorentz scalar and $\psi^\dagger\gamma^\mu\psi$ is not even Hermitian.

Dirac adjoints, in contrast, transform according to

$$\bar\psi \mapsto \left(\lambda \psi\right)^\dagger \gamma^0.$$

Using the identity $\gamma^0 \lambda^\dagger \gamma^0 = \lambda^{-1}$, the transformation reduces to

$$\bar\psi \mapsto \bar\psi \lambda^{-1},$$

Thus, $\bar\psi\psi$ transforms as a Lorentz scalar and $\bar\psi\gamma^\mu\psi$ as a four-vector.

== Usage ==
Using the Dirac adjoint, the probability four-current J for a spin-1/2 particle field can be written as

$$J^\mu = c \bar\psi \gamma^\mu \psi$$

where c is the speed of light and the components of J represent the probability density ρ and the probability 3-current j:

$$\boldsymbol J = (c \rho, \boldsymbol j).$$

Taking μ = 0 and using the relation for gamma matrices

$$\left(\gamma^0\right)^2 = I,$$

the probability density becomes

$$\rho = \psi^\dagger \psi.$$

== See also ==
- Dirac equation
- Rarita–Schwinger equation
