= Foldy–Wouthuysen transformation =

Used to understand the Dirac equation

The Foldy–Wouthuysen transformation was historically significant and was formulated by Leslie Lawrance Foldy and Siegfried Adolf Wouthuysen in 1949 to understand the nonrelativistic limit of the Dirac equation, the equation for spin-1/2 particles. A detailed general discussion of the Foldy–Wouthuysen-type transformations in particle interpretation of relativistic wave equations is in Acharya and Sudarshan (1960). Its utility in high energy physics is now limited due to the primary applications being in the ultra-relativistic domain where the Dirac field is treated as a quantised field.

== A canonical transform ==
The FW transformation is a unitary transformation of the orthonormal basis in which both the Hamiltonian and the state are represented. The eigenvalues do not change under such a unitary transformation, that is, the physics does not change under such a unitary basis transformation. Therefore, such a unitary transformation can always be applied: in particular a unitary basis transformation may be picked which will put the Hamiltonian in a more pleasant form, at the expense of a change in the state function, which then represents something else. See for example the Bogoliubov transformation, which is an orthogonal basis transform for the same purpose. The suggestion that the FW transform is applicable to the state or the Hamiltonian is thus not correct.

Foldy and Wouthuysen made use of a canonical transform that has now come to be known as the Foldy–Wouthuysen transformation. A brief account of the history of the transformation is to be found in the obituaries of Foldy and Wouthuysen and the biographical memoir of Foldy. Previous to there work, the Newton–Wigner localization work had shown that transformations exist that localize states. In 1950, Foldy and Wouthuysen sought one such transformation which made the position operator simply the vector $x$. This transformation caused the quantum Hamiltonian to match the classical Hamiltonian, the velocity operator to match the classical relation, and separated the spin and orbital angular momentum operators. Before their work, there was some difficulty in understanding and gathering all the interaction terms of a given order, such as those for a Dirac particle immersed in an external field. With their procedure the physical interpretation of the terms was clear, and it became possible to apply their work in a systematic way to a number of problems that had previously defyed solution. The Foldy–Wouthuysen transform was extended to the physically important cases of spin-0 and spin-1 particles, and even generalized to the case of arbitrary spins.

== Description ==
The Foldy–Wouthuysen (FW) transformation is a unitary transformation on a fermion wave function of the form:

$\psi \to \psi '=U\psi$	1

where the unitary operator is the 4 × 4 matrix:

$U=e^{\beta \boldsymbol{\alpha} \cdot \hat{\mathbf{p}} \theta} = \mathbb{I}_4 \cos \theta + \beta \boldsymbol{\alpha} \cdot \hat{\mathbf{p}} \sin \theta =e^{\boldsymbol{\gamma} \cdot \hat{\mathbf{p}} \theta} = \mathbb{I}_4 \cos \theta + \boldsymbol{\gamma} \cdot \hat{\mathbf{p}} \sin \theta$	2

Above,

$$\hat{p}^i \equiv \frac{p^i}{|\mathbf{p}|}$$

is the unit vector oriented in the direction of the fermion momentum. The above are related to the Dirac matrices by β = γ^{0} and α^{i} = γ^{0}γ^{i}, with i = 1, 2, 3. A straightforward series expansion applying the commutativity properties of the Dirac matrices demonstrates that 2 above is true. The inverse

$$U^{-1}=e^{-\beta \boldsymbol{\alpha} \cdot \hat{\mathbf{p}} \theta} = \mathbb{I}_4 \cos \theta - \beta \boldsymbol{\alpha} \cdot \hat{\mathbf{p}} \sin \theta$$

so it is clear that U^{−1}U = I, where I is a 4 × 4 identity matrix.

== Transforming the Dirac Hamiltonian for a free fermion ==
This transformation is of particular interest when applied to the free-fermion Dirac Hamiltonian operator

$$\hat{H}_0 \equiv \boldsymbol{\alpha} \cdot \mathbf{p} + \beta m$$

in biunitary fashion, in the form:

$$\begin{align}\hat{H}_0 \to \hat{H}'_0 &\equiv U \hat{H}_0 U^{-1} \\&= U (\boldsymbol{\alpha} \cdot \mathbf{p} + \beta m) U^{-1} \\&= (\cos \theta + \beta \boldsymbol{\alpha} \cdot \hat{ \mathbf{p}} \sin \theta ) (\boldsymbol{\alpha} \cdot \mathbf{p} + \beta m) (\cos \theta - \beta \boldsymbol{\alpha} \cdot \hat{ \mathbf{p}} \sin \theta ) \end{align}$$	3

Using the commutativity properties of the Dirac matrices, this can be massaged over into the double-angle expression:

$$\begin{align}\hat{H}'_0 &= (\boldsymbol{\alpha} \cdot \mathbf{p} + \beta m) (\cos \theta - \beta \boldsymbol{\alpha} \cdot \hat{ \mathbf{p}} \sin \theta )^2 \\&= (\boldsymbol{\alpha} \cdot \mathbf{p}+ \beta m) e^{-2\beta \boldsymbol{\alpha} \cdot \hat{ \mathbf{p}} \theta} \\&= (\boldsymbol{\alpha} \cdot \mathbf{p} + \beta m) (\cos 2\theta - \beta \boldsymbol{\alpha} \cdot \hat{ \mathbf{p}} \sin 2\theta ) \end{align}$$	4

This factors out into:

$\hat{H}'_0= \boldsymbol{\alpha} \cdot \mathbf{p} \left(\cos 2\theta - \frac{m}{|\mathbf{p}|} \sin 2\theta \right) + \beta (m \cos 2\theta + |\mathbf{p}| \sin 2\theta)$	5

=== Choosing a particular representation: Newton–Wigner ===
Clearly, the FW transformation is a continuous transformation, that is, one may employ any value for θ which one chooses. Choosing a particular value for θ amounts to choosing a particular transformed representation.

One particularly important representation is that in which the transformed Hamiltonian operator Ĥ′_{0} is diagonalized. A completely diagonal representation can be obtained by choosing θ such that the α · p term in 5 vanishes. This is arranged by choosing:

$\tan 2\theta \equiv \frac{|\mathbf{p}|}{m}$	6

In the Dirac-Pauli representation where β is a diagonal matrix, 5 is then reduced to a diagonal matrix:

$\hat{H}'_0= \beta (m \cos 2\theta + |\mathbf{p}| \sin 2\theta)$	7

By elementary trigonometry, 6 also implies that:

$\sin 2\theta = \frac{|\mathbf{p}|}\sqrt{m^2+|\mathbf{p}|^2} \quad \text{and} \quad \cos 2\theta = \frac{m}\sqrt{m^2+|\mathbf{p}|^2}$	8

so that using 8 in 7 and then simplifying now leads to:

$\hat{H}'_0= \beta \sqrt{m^2+|\mathbf{p}|^2}$	9

Prior to Foldy and Wouthuysen publishing their transformation, it was already known that 9 is the Hamiltonian in the Newton–Wigner (NW) representation (named after Theodore Duddell Newton and Eugene Wigner) of the Dirac equation. What 9 therefore tells us, is that by applying a FW transformation to the Dirac–Pauli representation of Dirac's equation, and then selecting the continuous transformation parameter θ so as to diagonalize the Hamiltonian, one arrives at the NW representation of Dirac's equation, because NW itself already contains the Hamiltonian specified in (9). See this link.

If one considers an on-shell mass—fermion or otherwise—given by m^{2} = p^{σ}p_{σ}, and employs a Minkowski metric tensor for which diag(η) = (+1, −1, −1, −1), it should be apparent that the expression

$$p^0 = \sqrt{m^2 + |\mathbf{p}|^2}$$

is equivalent to the E ≡ p^{0} component of the energy-momentum vector p^{μ}, so that 9 is alternatively specified rather simply by Ĥ′_{0} = βE.

=== Correspondence between the Dirac–Pauli and Newton–Wigner representations, for a fermion at rest ===
Now consider a fermion at rest, which we may define in this context as a fermion for which |p| = 0. From 6 or 8, this means that cos 2θ = 1, so that θ = 0, ±π, ±2π and, from 2, that the unitary operator U = ±I. Therefore, any operator O in the Dirac–Pauli representation upon which we perform a biunitary transformation, will be given, for an at-rest fermion, by:

$O \to O' \equiv U O U^{-1} = (\pm I) (O) (\pm I) = O$	10

Contrasting the original Dirac–Pauli Hamiltonian operator

$$\hat{H}_0 \equiv \boldsymbol{\alpha} \cdot \mathbf{p} + \beta m$$

with the NW Hamiltonian 9, we do indeed find the |p| = 0 "at rest" correspondence:

$\hat{H}_0 = \hat{H}'_0= \beta m$	11

== Transforming the velocity operator ==
=== In the Dirac–Pauli representation ===
Now, consider the velocity operator. To obtain this operator, we must commute the Hamiltonian operator Ĥ′_{0} with the canonical position operators x_{i}, i.e., we must calculate

$$\hat{v_i}\equiv i\left[\hat{H}_0,x_i\right]$$

One good way to approach this calculation, is to start by writing the scalar rest mass m as

$$m=\gamma^0\hat{H}_0+\gamma^jp_j$$

and then to mandate that the scalar rest mass commute with the x_{i}. Thus, we may write:

$0=[m,x_i]=\left[\left(\gamma^0\hat{H}_0+\gamma^jp_j\right),x_i\right]=\left[\gamma^0\hat{H}_0,x_i\right]+i\gamma_i$	12

where we have made use of the Heisenberg canonical commutation relationship [x_{i},p_{j}] = −iη_{ij} to reduce terms. Then, multiplying from the left by γ^{0} and rearranging terms, we arrive at:

$\frac{d\hat{x}_i}{dt}=\hat{v_i}\equiv i\left[\hat{H}_0,x_i\right]=\alpha_i$	13

Because the canonical relationship

$$i\left[\hat{H}_0,\hat{v}_i\right] \ne 0$$

the above provides the basis for computing an inherent, non-zero acceleration operator, which specifies the oscillatory motion known as zitterbewegung.

=== In the Newton–Wigner representation ===
In the Newton–Wigner representation, we now wish to calculate

$$\hat{v}_i'\equiv i\left[\hat{H}'_0,x_i\right]$$

If we use the result at the very end of section 2 above, Ĥ′_{0} = βp_{0}, then this can be written instead as:

$\hat{v}_i'\equiv i\left[\hat{H}'_0,x_i\right]=i \beta \left[p_0,x_i\right]$	14

Using the above, we need simply to calculate [p_{0},x_{i}], then multiply by iβ.

The canonical calculation proceeds similarly to the calculation in section 4 above, but because of the square root expression in p^{0} = √m^{2} + |p|^{2}, one additional step is required.

First, to accommodate the square root, we will wish to require that the scalar square mass m^{2} commute with the canonical coordinates x_{i}, which we write as:

$0 \equiv \left[m^2,x_i\right] = \left[\left(p^0p_0+p^jp_j\right),x_i\right] = \left[p^0p_0,x_i\right]+2ip_i$	15

where we again use the Heisenberg canonical relationship [x_{i},p_{j}] = −iη_{ij}. Then, we need an expression for [p_{0},x_{i}] which will satisfy 15. It is straightforward to verify that:

$i\left[p_0,x_i\right]=\frac{p_i}{p^0}=v_i$	16

will satisfy 15 when again employing [x_{i},p_{j}] = −iη_{ij}. Now, we simply return the iβ factor via 14, to arrive at:

$\frac{d\hat{x}_i'}{dt}=\hat{v}_i'\equiv i\left[\hat{H}'_0,x_i\right] = \beta \frac{p_i}{p^0} = \beta v_i$	17

This is understood to be the velocity operator in the Newton–Wigner representation. Because:

$i\left[\hat{H}'_0,\hat{v}_i'\right]=i\left[\beta p_0,\beta v_i\right]=0$	18

it is commonly thought that the zitterbewegung motion arising out of 12 vanishes when a fermion is transformed into the Newton–Wigner representation.

== Other applications ==
The powerful machinery of the Foldy–Wouthuysen transform originally developed for the Dirac equation has found applications in many situations such as acoustics, and optics.

It has found applications in very diverse areas such as atomic systems synchrotron radiation and derivation of the Bloch equation for polarized beams.

The application of the Foldy–Wouthuysen transformation is applied in acoustics to provide comprehensive and mathematically rigorous accounts.

In the traditional scheme the purpose of expanding the optical Hamiltonian

$$\hat{H} = - \left( n^2 (r) - \hat{p}_\perp^2 \right)^\frac12$$

in a series using

$$\frac{\hat{p}_\perp^2}{n_0^2}$$

as the expansion parameter is to understand the propagation of the quasi-paraxial beam in terms of a series of approximations (paraxial plus nonparaxial). Similar is the situation in the case of charged-particle optics. Let us recall that in relativistic quantum mechanics too one has a similar problem of understanding the relativistic wave equations as the nonrelativistic approximation plus the relativistic correction terms in the quasi-relativistic regime. For the Dirac equation (which is first-order in time) this is done most conveniently using the Foldy–Wouthuysen transformation leading to an iterative diagonalization technique. The main framework of the newly developed formalisms of optics (both light optics and charged-particle optics) is based on the transformation technique of Foldy–Wouthuysen theory which casts the Dirac equation in a form displaying the different interaction terms between the Dirac particle and an applied electromagnetic field in a nonrelativistic and easily interpretable form.

In the Foldy–Wouthuysen theory the Dirac equation is decoupled through a canonical transformation into two two-component equations: one reduces to the Pauli equation in the nonrelativistic limit and the other describes the negative-energy states. It is possible to write a Dirac-like matrix representation of Maxwell's equations. In such a matrix form the Foldy–Wouthuysen can be applied.

There is a close algebraic analogy between the Helmholtz equation (governing scalar optics) and the Klein–Gordon equation; and between the matrix form of the Maxwell's equations (governing vector optics) and the Dirac equation. So it is natural to use the methods of standard quantum mechanics (particularly, the Foldy–Wouthuysen transform) in analyzing these systems.

The suggestion to employ the Foldy–Wouthuysen Transformation technique in the case of the Helmholtz equation was mentioned in the literature as a remark.

It was only in the recent works, that this idea was exploited to analyze the quasiparaxial approximations for specific beam optical system. The Foldy–Wouthuysen technique is ideally suited for the Lie algebraic approach to optics. With all these plus points, the powerful and ambiguity-free expansion, the Foldy–Wouthuysen Transformation is still little used in optics. The technique of the Foldy–Wouthuysen Transformation results in what is known as nontraditional prescriptions of Helmholtz optics and Maxwell optics respectively. The nontraditional approaches give rise to very interesting wavelength-dependent modifications of the paraxial and aberration behaviour. The nontraditional formalism of Maxwell optics provides a unified framework of light beam optics and polarization. The nontraditional prescriptions of light optics are closely analogous with the quantum theory of charged-particle beam optics. In optics, it has enabled the deeper connections in the wavelength-dependent regime between light optics and charged-particle optics to be seen (see Electron optics).

== See also ==
- Relativistic quantum mechanics
- Schrieffer–Wolff transformation
