= Zitterbewegung =

Particle effect

In physics, the Zitterbewegung (German pronunciation: [ˈtsɪtɐ.bəˌveːɡʊŋ], from German zittern 'to tremble, jitter' and Bewegung 'motion') is the theoretical prediction of a rapid oscillatory motion of elementary particles that obey relativistic wave equations. This prediction was first discussed by Gregory Breit in 1928. The word was first applied to the relativistic motion of free electrons by Erwin Schrödinger in 1930 in his analysis of wave packet solutions of the Dirac equation for relativistic electrons in free space. These exhibit interference between positive and negative energy states, which produces an apparent fluctuation (up to the speed of light) of the position of an electron around the median, with an angular frequency of 2mc^{2}/ℏ, which is twice the Compton angular frequency.

The oscillatory Zitterbewegung motion is often interpreted as an artifact of using the Dirac equation in a single particle description and disappears in quantum field theory. For the hydrogen atom, the Zitterbewegung is related to the Darwin term, a small correction of the energy level of the s-orbitals.

== Theory ==
=== Free spin-1/2 fermion ===
The time-dependent Dirac equation is written as

$$H \psi (\mathbf{x},t) = i \hbar \frac{\partial\psi}{\partial t} (\mathbf{x},t)$$,

where $\hbar$ is the reduced Planck constant, $\psi(\mathbf{x},t)$ is the wave function (Dirac spinor) of a fermionic particle spin-1/2, and H is the Dirac Hamiltonian of a free particle:

$$H = \beta mc^2 + \sum_{j = 1}^3 \alpha_j p_j c$$,

where $m$ is the mass of the particle, $c$ is the speed of light, $p_j$ is the momentum operator, and $\beta$ and $\alpha_j$ are matrices related to the Gamma matrices $\gamma_\mu$, as $\beta=\gamma_0$ and $\alpha_j=\gamma_0\gamma_j$.

In the Heisenberg picture, the time dependence of an arbitrary observable Q obeys the equation

$$-i \hbar \frac{d Q}{d t} = \left[ H , Q \right] .$$

In particular, the time-dependence of the position operator is given by

$$\frac{d x_k(t)}{d t} = \frac{i}{\hbar}\left[ H , x_k \right] = c\alpha_k$$.

where x_{k}(t) is the position operator at time t.

The above equation shows that the operator $\alpha_k$ can be interpreted as the k-th component of a "velocity operator".

Note that this implies that

$$\left\langle \left(\frac{d x_k(t)}{d t}\right)^2 \right\rangle=c^2$$,

where we squared both sides of the expression and used the property that $\alpha_k^2=I_4$. The expectation value is now as if the "root mean square speed" in every direction of space is the speed of light.

To add time-dependence to α_{k}, one implements the Heisenberg picture, which says

$$\alpha_k (t) = e^\frac{i H t}{\hbar}\alpha_k e^{-\frac{i H t}{\hbar}}$$.

The time-dependence of the velocity operator is given by

$$\hbar \frac{d \alpha_k(t)}{d t} = i\left[ H , \alpha_k \right] = 2\left(i \gamma_k m - \sigma_{kl}p^l\right) = 2i\left(cp_k-\alpha_k(t)H\right)$$,

where

$$\sigma_{kl} \equiv \frac{i}{2}\left[\gamma_k,\gamma_l\right] .$$

Now, because both p_{k} and H are time-independent, the above equation can easily be integrated twice to find the explicit time-dependence of the position operator.

First:

$$\alpha_k (t) = \left(\alpha_k (0) - c p_k H^{-1}\right) e^{-\frac{2 i H t}{\hbar}} + c p_k H^{-1}$$,

and finally

$$x_k(t) = x_k(0) + c^2 p_k H^{-1} t + \tfrac12 i \hbar c H^{-1} \left( \alpha_k (0) - c p_k H^{-1} \right) \left( e^{-\frac{2 i H t}{\hbar}} - 1 \right)$$.

The resulting expression consists of an initial position, a motion proportional to time, and an oscillation term with an amplitude equal to the reduced Compton wavelength. That oscillation term is the so-called Zitterbewegung.

=== Gaussian wavepacket ===
Another way of observing the Zitterbewegung is to study the evolution of a Gaussian wavepacket. In the non-relativistic case, using Schrödinger equation a Gaussian wavepacket disperses uniformly, increasing in width and decreasing in height. Using Dirac equation, the wave packet disperses but displays an interference pattern (with features of the order of the Compton length) as it travels due to the Zitterbewegung.

== Interpretation ==
In quantum mechanics, the Zitterbewegung term vanishes on taking expectation values for wave-packets that are made up entirely of positive- (or entirely of negative-) energy waves. The standard relativistic velocity can be recovered by taking a Foldy–Wouthuysen transformation, when the positive and negative components are decoupled. Thus, we arrive at the interpretation of the Zitterbewegung as being caused by interference between positive- and negative-energy wave components.

In quantum electrodynamics (QED) the negative-energy states are replaced by positron states, and the Zitterbewegung is understood as the result of interaction of the electron with spontaneously forming and annihilating electron-positron pairs.

More recently, it has been noted that in the case of free particles it could just be an artifact of the simplified theory. Zitterbewegung appears as due to the "small components" of the Dirac 4-spinor, due to a little bit of antiparticle mixed up in the particle wavefunction for a nonrelativistic motion. It doesn't appear in the correct second quantized theory, or rather, it is resolved by using Feynman propagators and doing QED. Nevertheless, it is an interesting way to understand certain QED effects heuristically from the single particle picture.

=== Zigzag picture of fermions ===
An alternative perspective of the physical meaning of Zitterbewegung was provided by Roger Penrose, by observing that the Dirac equation can be reformulated by splitting the four-component Dirac spinor $\psi$ into a pair of massless left-handed and right-handed two-component spinors $\psi = (\psi_{\rm L}, \psi_{\rm R})$ (or zig and zag components), where each is the source term in the other's equation of motion, with a coupling constant proportional to the original particle's rest mass $m$, as

$$\left\{\begin{matrix}\sigma^\mu \partial_\mu \psi_{\rm R} =  m \psi_{\rm L}\\
\overline{\sigma}^\mu \partial_\mu \psi_{\rm L} =  m \psi_{\rm R}
\end{matrix}\right.$$.

The original massive Dirac particle can then be viewed as being composed of two massless components, each of which continually converts itself to the other. Since the components are massless they move at the speed of light, and their spin is constrained to be about the direction of motion, but each has opposite helicity: and since the spin remains constant, the direction of the velocity reverses, leading to the characteristic zigzag or Zitterbewegung motion.

== Experimental simulation ==
Zitterbewegung of a free relativistic particle has never been observed directly, although some authors believe they have found evidence in favor of its existence. It has also been simulated in atomic systems that provide analogues of a free Dirac particle. The first such example, in 2010, placed a trapped ion in an environment such that the non-relativistic Schrödinger equation for the ion had the same mathematical form as the Dirac equation. Zitterbewegung-like oscillations of ultracold atoms in optical lattices were predicted in 2008. In 2013, Zitterbewegung was simulated in a Bose–Einstein condensate of 50,000 atoms of ^{87}Rb confined in an optical trap.

Optical analogues of Zitterbewegung have been demonstrated in a quantum cellular automaton implemented with orbital angular momentum states of light, in photonic synthetic frequency dimensions, , and in superconducting qubits.

Zitterbewegung also occurs in the description of quasiparticles of the Bogoliubov Hamiltonian, which are described by a Dirac-like Hamiltonian with momentum-dependent mass. Other proposals for condensed-matter analogues include semiconductor nanostructures, graphene and topological insulators.

== See also ==
- Casimir effect
- Lamb shift
