= Strout =

Strout is a surname. Notable people with the surname include:

- Anton Strout (born 1970), American writer
- Cushing Strout (1923–2013), American intellectual historian
- Elizabeth Strout (born 1956), American writer
- Flora E. Strout (1867–1962), American teacher, social reformer
- Richard Strout (1898–1990), American journalist
- Tiffany Strout, American politician

== See also ==
- Frederick Strouts (1834–1919), New Zealand architect
