= Bernard Peters =

German nuclear physicist

- Born: Bernhard Pietrowski; December 22, 1910; Posen, Germany
- Died: February 2, 1993 (aged 82); Copenhagen, Denmark
- Known for: Cosmic Radiation and Geophysics
- Awards: Padma Bhushan

Bernard Peters (born Bernhard Pietrowski in 1910 in Posen, Germany - February 2, 1993 in Copenhagen) was a nuclear physicist, with a specialty in cosmic radiation. He was a recipient of the Padma Bhushan, the third highest Indian civilian award.

== Life ==
Peters was born Bernhard Pietrowski in Posen in 1910 to a German-speaking Polish-Jewish family. Towards the end of the First World War, his father, who was a pharmacology researcher and physician, sent him to the Black Forest to a farmer so he could obtain food in exchange for manual labor. In 1933, he was arrested as an anti-Nazi activist and held at Dachau for several months before emigrating to the United States.

In 1942, under the direction of Robert Oppenheimer, Peters completed his doctorate in physics. During his time at the Berkeley Radiation Laboratory Peters was active in the Federation of Architects, Engineers, Chemists and Technicians, a labor union affiliated to the Congress of Industrial Organizations.

In J Robert Oppenheimer's 1949 House Un-American Activities Committee hearing, Peters was accused of being a communist sympathizer, a "crazy person" and "quite a red" by Oppenheimer. The Rochester Times-Union broke the story a few days later, and Peters soon realized that his academic career in the US was affected. Peters could not find work in the United States, and in 1951 he left the country for Mumbai, India where he continued to study cosmic rays for eight years. Homi J. Bhabha, after consulting Nehru, helped him relocate to India. Bernard Peters was invited by Bhabha to Tata Institute of Fundamental Research in 1951. Peters was then invited to Denmark by Niels Bohr in 1958, and was until 1966/67 associated with the Niels Bohr Institute where he continued his research in particle physics and cosmic radiation. In 1967 the Danish Space Research Institute was founded and Peters became the director, shaping its objectives and leading it until the end of 1978. Peters was involved in the European Space Research Organization (ESRO) and other international organizations and realized early on the importance of scientific satellites in geostationary orbit and contributed to the GEOS satellite being included in ESRO's scientific program and to the Danish Space Research Institute being strongly placed in this program.

Peters died February 2, 1993, in Copenhagen, Denmark. His nephew David B. Kaplan is an American physicist.

== Works ==
- Deuteron disintegration by electrons. Scattering of mesotrons of spin ¹/₂, University of California, Berkeley, 1942 (thèse doctorale)
- Cosmic rays, solar particles, and space research, New York : Academic Press, 1963
- Cosmic radiation and its origin : contemporary problems, Neuilly-sur-Seine, France : European Space Research Organisation, 1967
- Creation of particles at cosmic-ray energies, Genève : CERN, 1966

Cosmic rays, New York : Academic Press, 1963
