= Ruth Sherman Tolman =

American psychologist and professor (1893–1957)

- Born: Ruth Sherman; October 9, 1893; Washington, Indiana, U.S.
- Died: September 18, 1957 (aged 63); Pasadena, California, U.S.
- Education: University of California, Los Angeles (BA); Occidental College (MA); University of California, Berkeley (PhD)
- Occupations: Psychologist, Professor
- Spouse: Richard C. Tolman (m. 1924; died 1948)

Ruth Tolman (née Sherman; October 9, 1893 – September 18, 1957) was an American psychologist and professor. She is known for her work on post-traumatic stress disorder and for her close relationship with J. Robert Oppenheimer, head of the Manhattan Project.

== Early life ==
Tolman was born in Washington, Indiana, on October 9, 1893, to Lillie Belle (née Graham) and Warren C. Sherman. She had an older sister named Lillie Margaret. Amongst the family's distant relatives were General William Tecumseh Sherman, Union General during the American Civil War, and Roger Sherman, one of the Founding Fathers of the United States.

Ruth received her undergraduate degree in psychology from the University of California, Los Angeles, in 1917. During her initial graduate studies at UCLA, she surveyed psychological variations in different groups of criminals.

At UCLA, she met her future husband Richard Tolman, a mathematical physicist and physical chemist who served as the dean of the graduate school at the time. They married in 1924 when she was thirty years old. Richard Tolman, who moved to the California Institute of Technology in 1922, is best known for serving as vice chairman of the National Defense Research Committee (under chairman Vannevar Bush) and as a scientific advisor to Major General Leslie Groves of the Manhattan Project during World War II.

== Career ==
During her career, Tolman was a prominent figure in the subfield of clinical psychology. Following her marriage, she stayed on as a research associate and instructor at UCLA (1927–1929) before teaching at Occidental College (instructor of psychology; 1930–1932) and Scripps College (lecturer in psychology; 1934), also receiving her M.A. in psychology from Occidental in 1930. Shortly before completing her Ph.D. in clinical psychology at the University of California, Berkeley in 1937, she became the senior psychological examiner for the Los Angeles County Probation Department (1936–1940). While writing six books and helping to create an early treatment for post-traumatic stress disorder, she was also the first woman ever to be elected to the Society for the Psychological Study of Social Issues (SPSSI).

Tolman was proactive in helping other women achieve the same goals as she had. Throughout World War II, she served on a committee called the Service of Women Psychologists in the Emergency Committee on Psychology (ECP). The organization's purpose was to help prepare women psychologists to fill the role of male psychologists who were away, serving in the military, and to help address the discrimination felt by female psychologists.

As the war commenced, Tolman was recruited by government agencies that were then hiring psychologists. After the Tolmans temporarily relocated to Washington, D.C., she spent a year (1941–1942) as an associate social science analyst with the Program Survey Section of the Department of Agriculture. This led to a two-year stint (1942–1944) as a public opinion analyst with the Office of War Information. Her last assignment (1944–1945) was that of clinical psychologist with the Office of Strategic Services (OSS), which was the forerunner of the Central Intelligence Agency. The role required her to devise tests to assess the psychological stability of field agents.

Following the war, she and her husband returned to California. There, Tolman became head of clinical psychology training at the Veterans Administration's local office from 1946 to 1954, treating soldiers who were suffering from post-traumatic stress disorder (then characterized as "battle fatigue"). This effort greatly advanced her career and made her a noteworthy figure. From 1953 to 1957, she also served as a clinical professor of psychology at UCLA while maintaining an affiliation with the Veterans Administration's local Mental Hygiene Clinic (1954–1957). For her contributions, Tolman was elected a Fellow of the American Psychological Association.

== Personal life ==
After the war, the Tolmans moved to a house on the grounds of the California Institute of Technology in Pasadena, California where they lived for the remainder of their lives.

Around this time, Ruth began an emotional affair with J. Robert Oppenheimer, the wartime head of the Los Alamos Laboratory and main figure credited with being the "father of the atomic bomb" for his role in the Manhattan Project. The two had met in 1928; Tolman was ten years older than Oppenheimer but the two shared a lot in common and became good friends. It was on-and-off after Oppenheimer moved back east to become director of the Institute of Advanced Studies. However, Patricia Klaus and Shirley Streshinsky, authors of An Atomic Love Story, concluded: "it was not believed to have been sexual, only a close emotional bond and connection."

Kai Bird, author of American Prometheus, wrote that Tolman loved her husband and was devastated when he died of a heart attack in 1948. After Richard's death, she found solace with Oppenheimer. The two occasionally met up and would often exchange letters. Many of them were destroyed after Ruth's death but those which survive show a close and affectionate relationship between the two.

Ruth Sherman Tolman died in Pasadena, California, at the age of 64, on September 18, 1957, and was buried in Woods Hole, Massachusetts.

== In popular culture ==
In the 2023 film Oppenheimer, directed by Christopher Nolan, Tolman was portrayed by actress Louise Lombard.
