= Cushing Strout =

American intellectual historian (1923–2013)

Cushing Strout

Sewall Cushing Strout (April 19, 1923 – November 21, 2013) was an American intellectual historian. He was Ernest I. White Professor of American Studies and Humane Letters at Cornell University.

Strout was born in Portland, Maine, and attended Williams College in Massachusetts between 1941 and 1947. During this time he served in the U.S. Army in Europe in World War II. He went on to gain an MA and a PhD at Harvard University.

Strout taught at Williams College, Yale University and the California Institute of Technology before moving to Cornell in 1962. At Cornell he held the Ernest I. White Chair of American Studies and Humane Letters from 1975 until his retirement in 1989.

Strout and his wife, Jean Philbrick, were married for 65 years and had three sons. Strout died in Ithaca, New York, in November 2013, aged 90.

== Works ==
- The Pragmatic Revolt in American History: Carl Becker and Charles Beard (1959)
- The American Image of the Old World (1963)
- Hawthorne in England: Selections from "Our Old Home" and "The English Note-Books" (1965)
- Conscience, Science & Security: The Case Of Dr. J. Robert Oppenheimer (1965) editor
- Spirit of American Government by J. Allen Smith (1965) editor
- Intellectual History in America (1968) editor, two volumes, Contemporary Essays on Puritanism, the Enlightenment & Romanticism, and From Darwin to Niebuhr
- Divided We Stand: Reflections on the Crisis at Cornell (1970) editor with David I. Grossvogel
- The New Heavens and New Earth: Political Religion in America (1973)
- The Veracious Imagination: Essays on American History, Literature and Biography (1981)
- Making American Tradition: Visions & Revisions from Ben Franklin to Alice Walker (1990)
