= Klein–Gordon equation =

Relativistic wave equation in quantum mechanics

In particle physics, the Klein–Gordon equation is a relativistic wave equation for spinless particles. It was discovered in 1926 as the relativistic generalization of the Schrödinger equation, developed independently by numerous authors, among them Oskar Klein and Walter Gordon, after whom it is commonly named. Within relativistic quantum mechanics, it suffers from numerous conceptual problems that are only resolved in quantum field theory, where the equation describes the dynamics of spin-0 fields. Mathematically, it is a linear second-order hyperbolic partial differential equation that is manifestly Lorentz covariant and can be viewed as the wave equation form of the relativistic energy–momentum relation. It plays a fundamental role in many areas of modern physics, such as quantum field theory, particle physics, and cosmology.

== History ==
=== Discovery ===
The Klein–Gordon equation was discovered independently in the mid-1920s by numerous physicists. As such, Wolfgang Pauli famously described it as "the equation with many fathers". It is sometimes referred to as Schrödinger's relativistic equation or the Klein–Gordon–Fock equation.

The first to discover the equation in December 1925, but not publish it, was Erwin Schrödinger. His derivation was motivated by de Broglie's theory for matter waves, with Schrödinger attempting to find a wave equation describing their evolution. He applied the Klein–Gordon equation to the hydrogen atom, where he calculated the fine structure of its spectrum. Finding that this did not match the experimental results, it demotivated him from investigating the equation further. As a result, he only published the non-relativistic limit of the equation in early 1926, the Schrödinger equation. It was only in his fourth paper in July 1926 that he published the full Klein–Gordon equation.

During the 1920s Oskar Klein was developing his own theory of waves, not dissimilar to de Broglie's theory. In particular, he became convinced that his wave theory of atoms could be connected to a unification of Maxwellian electrodynamics and Einsteinian general relativity. This led him to the idea of unifying them in a five-dimensional theory of relativity (see Kaluza–Klein theory), where he interpreted the extra dimension to not be a real physical direction, rather a formal internal coordinate encoding the electric charge. From this theory he derived the Klein–Gordon equation, but did not assign much importance to it, as it only formed a small part of his April 1926 publication. This was the first time that the equation appeared in print. Klein later claimed to have discovered the equation originally in summer 1925, before Schrödinger, but there is no direct primary evidence for this.

After Schrödinger's original publication of the non-relativistic equation, it was a straightforward matter to generalize the equation to its relativistic form. In this way Pauli got the relativistic equation in April 1926 but did not publish it. He lost confidence in the equation after he did not manage to use it to establish the equivalence between matrix mechanics and wave mechanics, like he could for the Schrödinger equation.

Meanwhile, unaware of Klein's paper, Vladimir Fock likewise derived the equation and published it in June. He focused on discussing the wave equation to study the Zeeman effect and Stark effect. He was also the first to publish the resulting fine structure for hydrogen using the equation, found earlier by Schrödinger. Shortly afterwards, Carl Eckart also calculated the Klein–Gordon hydrogen fine structure.

Louis de Broglie likewise derived the equation and published it in July, motivated by Schrödinger's non-relativistic formulation of his matter wave theory hypothesis.

Walter Gordon also derived the equation and published it at the end of September, primarily focusing on applying it to the Compton effect, also deriving the current associated to the Klein–Gordon equation, a result found previously by Klein.

Finally, there were three other discoverers of the Klein–Gordon equation. They were Théophile De Donder and Frans-H. van den Dungen, who were treating general dynamical systems and were not explicitly focused on quantum theory at all. Their paper was published in July 1926. Johann Kudar likewise published about the Klein–Gordon equation in 1926.

=== Consequences ===
The equation was used in the following years to investigate a handful of problems. For example, Victor Bursian used it to treat dispersion as a perturbation, finding only a small relativistic correction to the result found from the Schrödinger equation. Apart from its use in studying dispersion and Compton scattering, the equation was not very useful for treating most physical problems, primarily due to its inability to incorporate spin. More importantly, it was unappealing to the theorists as it failed to accommodate the principles of quantum mechanics as understood at the time, such as the Heisenberg uncertainty principle, Born's probabilistic interpretation, and the transformation theory of Paul Dirac and Pascual Jordan. As a result, the equation did not play an important role in the development of quantum mechanics.

While the equation virtually disappeared from physics after the Dirac equation was discovered in 1928, it was revived in 1934 by Pauli and Victor Weisskopf who reinterpreted it in light of the theory of field quantization developed at the time, giving it a tenable quantum interpretation as describing spin-0 particles. This allowed for the negative energy states that appeared in naive quantum mechanical interpretation to be instead reinterpreted as antiparticles.

The first spin-0 particle to be predicted was the meson in 1935 by Hideki Yukawa, which utilized a form of the equation. The first mesons to be discovered were charged pions in 1947, whose kinematics are described by the Klein–Gordon equation. Many other mesons were discovered in the following decades. The first elementary spin-0 particle to be discovered was the Higgs boson in 2012.

Since relativistic scalar fields play a prominent role in modern physics, the Klein–Gordon is likewise indispensable in many areas. For example, such scalar fields are found in cosmology and the theory of inflation, in the description of dark matter candidates such as axions and many other Beyond the Standard Model scenarios, in many areas of theoretical physics such as string theory in the form of moduli, and in the AdS/CFT correspondence.

== Formulation ==
=== Definition ===
The Klein–Gordon equation describes the time evolution of a real scalar field $\phi(t, \boldsymbol x)$, which is a field that assigns a real number to each point in spacetime. The equation is a second order hyperbolic partial differential equation given by

$$\bigg(\frac{1}{c^2} \frac{\partial^2}{\partial t^2} - \nabla^2 + \frac{c^2 m^2}{\hbar^2}\bigg)\phi(t, \boldsymbol x) = 0.$$

Here $\nabla^2$ is the Laplace operator, $c$ the speed of light, and $\hbar$ is the reduced Planck constant. The parameter $m$ plays the role of the mass of the scalar field. (Note: This can be seen from the role that $m$ plays in the dispersion relation for plane wave solutions $\phi(x) = e^{i\omega t-i\boldsymbol k \cdot \boldsymbol x}$ giving $\omega ^2 = \boldsymbol k^2 + m^2$ in natural units.) The time-independent case of the equation is equivalent to the screened Poisson equation. A more concise expression for the equation employs natural units, where both the speed of light and the reduced Planck constant are set to unity, i.e. $c = \hbar = 1$. The differential operator takes the form of the d'Alembert operator $\square = \eta^{\mu\nu}\partial_\mu\partial_\nu$, where $\eta^{\mu\nu}$ is the raised flat metric. The Klein–Gordon equation then takes the form

Klein–Gordon equation

$(\square + m^2)\phi(x) = 0.$

The Klein–Gordon equation can also act on a complex scalar field $\chi(x)$, which is a field that assigns to each point in spacetime a complex number. In this case the equation can be decomposed into a pair of Klein–Gordon equations acting independently on the two degrees of freedom of the complex scalar field. These can be the real and imaginary components, or alternatively the field and its complex conjugate. This decomposition holds because a non-interacting theory of a single complex scalar field is equivalent to a theory of two decoupled real scalar fields.

In the case of a complex scalar field, electromagnetic interactions can be introduced by minimally coupling the fields through the introduction of a gauge covariant derivative

$$D_\mu \chi = (\partial_\mu - ieA_\mu)\chi(x),$$

where $A_\mu$ is the gauge field and $e$ is the electric charge of the scalar field. The covariant derivative is introduced to ensure that the resulting theory is gauge invariant under gauge transformations where the gauge field and scalar field transform as

$$A_\mu(x) \rightarrow A_\mu(x) + \partial_\mu \lambda(x), \ \ \ \ \ \ \ \ \chi(x) \rightarrow e^{ie\lambda(x)}\chi(x),$$

for a gauge parameter $\lambda(x)$. The Klein–Gordon equation minimally coupled to electromagnetism then takes the form

$$(D_\mu D^\mu + m^2)\chi(x) = 0.$$

This equation describes the evolution of a complex scalar fields in scalar electrodynamics.

=== Lagrangian formulation ===
In a Lagrangian formulation, the Klein–Gordon equation for a real scalar field can be obtained as the Euler–Lagrange equation of the Lagrangian

$$\mathcal L = \frac{1}{2}\partial^\mu \phi \partial_\mu \phi - \frac{1}{2}m^2 \phi^2.$$

In quantum field theory this Lagrangian describes a massive non-interacting real scalar field whose excitations are scalar bosons of mass $m$. In the case of a complex scalar field $\chi(x)$, its Lagrangian is given by

$$\mathcal L = \partial^\mu \chi^\dagger \partial_\mu \chi - m^2 \chi^\dagger \chi.$$

The Klein–Gordon equation for $\chi$ and $\chi^\dagger$ is found by varying the Lagrangian with respect to $\chi^\dagger$ and $\chi$, respectively. This Lagrangian is manifestly invariant under a global $\text{U}(1)$ symmetry, which when gauged results in scalar electrodynamics. The Lagrangian formulation is useful when calculating the currents associated with the symmetries using Noether's theorem.

=== Correspondence principle derivation ===
The equation can be derived analogously to how the Schrödinger equation is derived from the non-relativistic equation for the energy of a particle. In particular, in the non-relativistic limit, the energy $E$ of a free particle with momentum $\boldsymbol p$ is given by

$$E = \frac{1}{2m}\boldsymbol p^2.$$

By elevating the momentum and energy to operators through the correspondence principle

$$\boldsymbol p \rightarrow \hat{\boldsymbol p} = -i\hbar \nabla, \ \ \ \ \ \ \ \ E \rightarrow \hat E = i\hbar \frac{\partial}{\partial t},$$

this gives the Schrödinger equation. The Klein–Gordon equation is similarly acquired by analogously replacing the energy and momentum by the corresponding operators in the relativistic energy-momentum relation

$$E^2 = \boldsymbol p^2 + m^2.$$

Attempting to acquire the equation for the square root of the above expression is on the other hand problematic since time and space do not appear on an equal footing. Additionally, one would have square roots of differential operators, which are usually handled by Taylor expanding the square root. This leads to an infinite series of higher derivative terms, making the theory difficult to work with.

== Properties ==
=== Symmetries ===
The equation transforms covariantly under spacetime translations and the Lorentz group. Together, these form the Poincaré group which encodes the isometries of flat spacetime. Scalar fields transform as scalars under Lorentz transformations, meaning that under $x'^\mu = \Lambda^\mu{}_\nu x^\nu$, the scalar field transforms as $\phi'(x') = \phi(x)$.

Global symmetries give rise to currents and charges through Noether's theorem. The four currents corresponding to the four spacetime translations are given by the stress-energy tensor, which for a real scalar field theory is given by

$$T^{\mu\nu} = \partial^\mu \phi \partial^\nu \phi - g^{\mu\nu} \mathcal L,$$

where $\mathcal L$ is the Lagrangian. The conserved charges are given by the spatial integral of the zeroth component of the current. In this case the conserved charges are the total energy and momentum of the field. For Lorentz transformations, the six currents are expressed in terms of the stress-energy tensor as

$$\mathcal M^{\mu\nu\rho} = x^\nu T^{\mu \rho} - x^\rho T^{\mu\nu}.$$

The conserved charges arising from the three rotational degrees of freedom are the angular momenta, while for the three boosts they correspond to the motion of the centre of energy.

The real scalar field theory also has an internal discrete $\mathbb Z_2$ symmetry $\phi(x) \rightarrow -\phi(x)$, although this has no dynamical consequences in the free theory. In the case of a complex scalar field, there is a continuous internal $\text{U}(1)$ phase symmetry

$$\chi(x) \rightarrow e^{i\alpha}\chi(x),$$

with an associated Noether current given by

$$j^\mu = i(\chi^\dagger \partial^\mu \chi - \chi \partial^\mu \chi^\dagger).$$

The conserved charge to this symmetry measures the difference in the number of particles to antiparticles. When coupled to electromagnetism, the charge is the electric charge, the conservation of which corresponds to charge conservation.

=== Green's functions ===
The Klein–Gordon equation can be elevated to the inhomogeneous Klein–Gordon equation through the introduction of a source term $J(x)$ as

$$(\square + m^2)\phi(x) = J(x).$$

This equation admits a general solution of the form

$$\phi(x) = \int d^4 y \ G(x,y)J(y),$$

where $G(x,y)$ is known as the Green's function, which is the formal solution to the equation

$$(\square +m^2)G(x,y) = -i\delta^4(x-y).$$

The principle behind the Green's function $G(x,y)$ is to relate the solution at $x$ to some forcing term at $y$. While the Green's function can be seen as the formal inverse of the Klein–Gordon operator $(\square + m^2)^{-1}$, this choice is not unique. A precise choice of the Green's function requires a choice of boundary conditions, specifying where it has support, such as vanishing for certain values of $y$.

For example, the retarded Green's function is defined as relating the solution at the present to impulses strictly from the past $y^0<x^0$. Meanwhile, the advanced Green's function relates solutions in the present to impulses strictly from the future. These are given by

$$G_{r,a}(x,y) = \lim_{\epsilon \rightarrow 0} \int \frac{d^4 p}{(2\pi)^4}\frac{e^{ip\cdot (x-y)}}{(p_0 \pm i\epsilon)^2-\boldsymbol p^2 - m^2},$$

where the positive sign corresponds to the advanced Green's function.

Another common choice of boundary condition results in the Feynman propagator, which implements time-ordering and is given by (Note: In quantum field theory the Feynman propagator conventionally includes a factor of $i$ as $\Delta_F(x,y) = iG_F(x,y)$.)

$$G_F(x,y) = \lim_{\epsilon \rightarrow 0} \int \frac{d^4 p}{(2\pi)^4} \frac{e^{ip \cdot(x-y)}}{p^2-m^2+i\epsilon}.$$

In quantum field theory, this propagator is proportional to the time-ordered two-point correlation function for scalar fields.

=== Plane-wave solutions ===
The Klein–Gordon equation can be solved directly by plugging in the Fourier transform of the scalar field

$$\phi(x) = \int \frac{d^4p}{(2\pi)^4} \phi(p) e^{-ip_\mu x^\mu}.$$

The d'Alembert operator only acts on the 4-position term in the exponent, bringing down factors of momentum. The equation then reduces to a constraint on the 4-momentum of the plane waves

$$p_\mu p^\mu = m^2.$$

Writing this in terms of the energy and 3-momentum reveals that it is equivalent to the energy-momentum relation for a massive particle $E^2 - \boldsymbol p^2 = m^2$. Therefore, the most general solution to the Klein–Gordon equation is a superposition of plane wave solutions whose momenta satisfy the energy-momentum relation.

By imposing the on-shell condition, such as through the insertion of delta functions into the Fourier transform solution, a more explicit form for the solutions is found (Note: Different normalizations exist for the denominator, with sometimes one replacing $(2\pi)^3 2E(\boldsymbol p)$ with $(2\pi)^{3/2}\sqrt{2E(\boldsymbol p)}$.)

$$\phi(x) = \int \frac{d^3 \boldsymbol p}{(2\pi)^3} \frac{1}{2 E(\boldsymbol p)}(A(\boldsymbol p)e^{-ip_\mu x^\mu} + B(\boldsymbol p)e^{ip_\mu x^\mu}),$$

where $A(\boldsymbol p)$ and $B(\boldsymbol p)$ are arbitrary functions of the 3-momentum, and $E(\boldsymbol p) = \sqrt{\boldsymbol p^2+m^2}$ is the energy of the modes. This form makes explicit the inevitable presence of both positive and negative frequency solutions.

=== Other solutions ===
When the Klein–Gordon equation is minimally coupled to electromagnetism with a Coulomb potential, it is used to study exotic atoms whose nuclei are orbited by spinless bosonic particles. For example, in a pionic atom, the atomic nucleus is orbited by negatively charged pions $\pi^-$ with mass $m_\pi$. The lifetime of pions is long enough for this system to form bound states before the pion decays.

The case when only one pion orbits a nucleus of charge $Ze$ can be solved directly. Stationary solutions for a Coulomb potential use separation of variables, where the field is written as $\phi(x) = e^{-i\epsilon t}\Phi(\boldsymbol x)$, to express the Klein–Gordon equation as

$$\bigg[\bigg(\epsilon + \frac{Z\alpha}{r}\bigg)^2 + \nabla^2 - m_\pi^2\bigg]\Phi(\boldsymbol x)=0,$$

where $\alpha$ is the fine-structure constant. The energy levels of this system are then given by

$$E_{\text{KG}} = \frac{m_\pi}{\sqrt{1+\frac{(Z\alpha)^2}{\Big(n-\big(l+\tfrac{1}{2}\big)+\sqrt{\big(l+\tfrac{1}{2}\big)^2-(Z\alpha)^2}\Big)^2}}},$$

where $n$ is the principal quantum number and $l$ is the orbital angular momentum quantum number. In contrast to the nonrelativistic case, relativistic effects lift the degeneracy in the $l$ states.

These energy levels differ from traditional atoms because electrons are fermions with spin half, while the Klein–Gordon equation describes bosonic spin zero particles. However, the expression for the energy levels for regular atoms, known as the Sommerfeld formula, is very similar. It is directly acquired from the above through the replacement of the pion mass with the electron mass and by replacing $l \rightarrow j$, the spin-orbital angular quantum number. The energy levels predicted by $E_{\text{KG}}$ have successfully been observed in pionic atoms.

The solution breaks down when $Z\alpha > l+1/2$, where the square root becomes imaginary, which first happens for $Z=69$. Physically, the attractive Coulomb potential is too strong, with the kinetic energy of the pion being insufficient to stop the pion from spiralling into the nucleus. Unlike in the non-relativistic case, heuristically this occurs at a classical level in the relativistic theory because the velocity of the pion cannot increase fast enough as its orbital radius decreases in order to maintain the centrifugal force needed to resist the Coulomb force. More precisely, the issue arises because the wavefunction develops pathological short distance behaviour. For realistic atomic nuclei, this problem is partially avoided for larger $Z$ due to them not have perfect point-like Coulomb potentials.

Another notable solution to the Klein–Gordon equation is the scattering of an initial plane-wave off an potential step of height $V$. The properties of this solution are described by a reflection coefficient $R$ and a transmission coefficient $T$, which satisfy $R+T=1$. They describe the probability of the incident wave being reflected off the barrier or passing through it, respectively. For large incoming energies $E>V+m$, both the reflection and transmission coefficients are non-zero, with there being some probability of the particle passing through the barrier and some probability of it being reflected. In the case when $V+m>E>V-m$, the transmission coefficient is zero and the reflection coefficient is one, with the particle always being reflected. This behaviour matches that found for the non-relativistic Schrödinger equation.

However, when the potential is very large $V>E+m$, the solution acquires a negative transmission coefficients $T<0$ and a reflection coefficient greater than one $R>1$. This behaviour is known as the Klein paradox and it was first described by Oskar Klein for the Dirac equation. The paradox is resolved by reinterpreting the phenomenon as particle-antiparticle pair creation from the potential barrier itself. Antiparticles are then attracted to the potential while particles are repulsed, contributing to the reflected beam, increasing the amount of particles observed coming back from the barrier. A full analysis requires a relativistic multiparticle theory in the form of quantum field theory.

== Quantum theory ==
=== Quantum mechanics ===
The Klein–Gordon equation was originally devised in the context of relativistic quantum mechanics, where it serves the role of a relativistic generalization of the Schrödinger equation. There it describes the evolution of the complex-valued wavefunction $\Psi(t,\boldsymbol x)$ through

$$\hbar^2 \frac{\partial^2}{\partial t^2}\Psi(t,\boldsymbol x) = \big(c^2 \hbar^2 \nabla^2 - c^4 m^2\big)\Psi(t,\boldsymbol x),$$

where $\nabla^2$ is the Laplacian, $\hbar$ is the reduced Planck constant, and $c$ is the speed of light.

If the Klein–Gordon equation is to describe a wavefunction, there needs to be a corresponding conserved probability density that can be built from the wavefunction. The candidate probability density, given by the zeroth component of the four-current corresponding to the $\text{U}(1)$ complex phase symmetry $\Psi(t,\boldsymbol x) \rightarrow e^{i\theta}\Psi(t,\boldsymbol x)$, is given by

$$P(\boldsymbol r,t) = \frac{i\hbar}{2mc^2}\bigg(\Psi^*\frac{\partial \Psi}{\partial t} - \Psi \frac{\partial \Psi^*}{\partial t}\bigg).$$

While this is conserved, it is not positive definite and therefore cannot be interpreted as a probability density. This is despite the fact that its corresponding 3-current matches the form of the probability current for the Schrödinger equation in the non-relativistic limit.

Another issue is the presence of negative energy states. Plane wave solutions of the equation $\Psi = A e^{-i(E t - \boldsymbol p \cdot \boldsymbol x)/\hbar}$ admit both positive energy solutions $E > mc^2$ and negative energy solutions $E < -mc^2$. In principle, the presence of an unbounded spectrum is not a problem in a theory with no interactions. However, the issues arise once interactions are included, such as through coupling to the electromagnetic field. Historically, this was seen as a problem because then there is nothing preventing indefinite decay of a state through emission of electromagnetic radiation. From a modern perspective this instead reflects the breakdown of the single-particle interpretation of the theory.

=== Quantum field theory ===
In the second quantization framework of quantum field theory, fields are elevated to be operators acting on states. They can be used to create or destroy particles or antiparticles when acting on a state. For a complex scalar field, the operator $\hat \phi(x)$ annihilates particles and creates antiparticles, while $\hat \phi^\dagger(x)$ creates particles and annihilates antiparticles. This is in contrast to relativistic quantum mechanics where the field rather corresponds to a wavefunction describing the state of a single particle. The Klein–Gordon equation describes the equation of motion for the field operator and the particles it creates. In the limit of large occupation numbers in a coherent or semiclassical state, the quantum field theory for a scalar field reduces to a classical field theory.

The negative frequency states that cause issues in the quantum mechanical application of the Klein–Gordon equation are reinterpreted as positive energy antiparticles. For a real scalar field theory, particles are their own antiparticles, while for a complex scalar field theory the two have opposite charges. The candidate probability density for the quantum theory, which failed to be positive definite, is instead reinterpreted as describing the conserved charge density operator in the quantum field theory.

== Related equations ==
=== Non-relativistic limit ===
The non-relativistic limit $v\ll c$ of the complex Klein–Gordon equation yields the Schrödinger equation at leading order. This can be derived by factoring out the oscillating rest mass energy through the field redefinition

$$\chi(t,\boldsymbol x) = \tilde \chi(t,\boldsymbol x)e^{-imt},$$

and by restricting to the positive frequency particle sector, thus dropping antiparticle from the spectrum. A more careful approach yields two independent Schrödinger equations for two complex fields $(\tilde \chi_{1},\tilde \chi_2)$, one for the particle and one for the antiparticle. The resulting non-relativistic theory has an expanded $\text{U}(2)$ symmetry group associated with the complex pair $(\tilde \chi_1, \tilde \chi_2)$. This has a $\text{U}(1)\times \text{U}(1)$ subgroup, corresponding to a phase redefinition of each $\tilde \chi_i$, which implies conservation of particle number and antiparticle number, separately. When interactions are included, these symmetries can break down to a single global $\text{U}(2) \rightarrow \text{U}(1)$ corresponding to charge conservation inherited from the full relativistic theory. Additionally, the non-relativistic effective field theory may have a limited range of viability, such as only holding in the case when particles and antiparticles do not meet and annihilate into relativistic states. If such events are allowed to occur and the effective field theory does not include the relativistic degrees of freedom, then the non-relativistic effective field theory is no longer a closed unitary theory.

The non-relativistic limit of the real Klein–Gordon equation is more subtle due to the particle being its own antiparticle. It can however be defined, with a single relativistic real scalar field resulting in a theory for a single complex scalar field in the non-relativistic limit. Despite being a complex field, the degrees of freedom match since the relativistic theory is a second derivative theory in time while the non-relativistic theory is a first order theory, thus each non-relativistic field has half as many degrees of freedom as in the relativistic theory. The naive definition of the non-relativistic complex scalar field $\psi(t, \boldsymbol x)$ from the relativistic field $\phi(t,\boldsymbol x)$ is

$$\phi(t, \boldsymbol x) = \frac{1}{\sqrt{2m}}[\psi(t, \boldsymbol x)e^{-imt}+\psi^*(t,\boldsymbol x)e^{imt}].$$

This definition works well for a free theory where the non-relativistic theory for $\psi(t,\boldsymbol x)$ is obtained by dropping high frequency terms of order $m$, giving the Schrödinger equation to leading order. However, when interactions are taken into account, a modified non-local definition of $\psi(t,\boldsymbol x)$ is usually used to more easily arrive at an effective non-relativistic theory. The non-relativistic theory also has an emergent $\text{U}(1)$ symmetry, which is exact in the non-interacting case. This symmetry implies particle number conservation with a number charge of

$$N = \int d^3 \boldsymbol x \ |\psi|^2.$$

In a self-interacting theory, this symmetry holds to all orders in perturbation theory in the limit of sufficiently low energies $E\ll m$ and for low occupation numbers that kinematically disallow number violating processes.

While the limit of the classical non-interacting Klein–Gordon equation to the classical Schrödinger equation is straight forward, more care has to be taken when taking the limit of the quantum field theory to non-relativistic quantum mechanics. This is because the fundamental variables used differ significantly in the two frameworks.

A crude way to take the non-relativistic limit is to construct the wavefunction of the particle state. In particular, for the complex Klein–Gordon field, this is done by using the quantum field theory field operator to create a state of a particle at position $\boldsymbol x$ as (Note: Usually this is done more precisely using smearing.)

$$|\boldsymbol x\rangle = \phi^\dagger(\boldsymbol x) |0\rangle.$$

This is then used to construct a more general state as a superposition of these position states

$$|\varphi\rangle = \int d^3 x \varphi(\boldsymbol x)|\boldsymbol x\rangle,$$

where $\varphi(\boldsymbol x)$ is now the wavefunction. By constructing the field theory Hamiltonian, one can then show that this implies the Schrödinger equation for the wavefunction

$$i\frac{\partial \varphi}{\partial t} = -\frac{1}{2m}\nabla^2 \varphi.$$

This procedure is rather technically imprecise, and does not easily generalize to include interactions. It also does not address what happened to the antiparticle degrees of freedom. Instead, a more careful analysis shows that the non-relativistic limit gives rise to the Schrödinger equation for both the particle and antiparticle. This procedure can also be used in the case of a real Klein–Gordon field to get a non-relativistic quantum theory.

=== Klein–Gordon equation in curved spacetime ===
In curved spacetime, the flat metric has to be elevated to a curved metric, and the derivatives need to be modified to account for the spacetime curvature through the introduction of a covariant derivative $\nabla_\mu$. In the mostly negative metric signature, the Klein–Gordon equation in curved spacetime takes the form

$$(g^{\mu\nu}\nabla_\mu\nabla_\nu + m^2) \phi = 0.$$

An alternative form that replaces the covariant derivative with regular partial derivatives, avoiding having to explicitly calculate the Christoffel symbols, is given by

$$\frac{1}{\sqrt{-g}}\partial_\mu(\sqrt{-g} g^{\mu\nu}\partial_\nu \phi) + m^2 \phi = 0.$$

Here $g^{\mu\nu}$ is the inverse metric tensor and $g$ is the determinant of the metric.

A more general form of the Klein–Gordon equation that allows for non-minimal coupling to gravity is given by

$$(\nabla^\mu\nabla_\mu +m^2 +\xi R)\phi = 0,$$

where $R$ is the Ricci scalar. The case of $\xi=0$ is known as minimal coupling, with the equation reducing to the aforementioned form. Meanwhile, in $d$ dimensional spacetime, when

$$\xi = \frac{1}{4}\frac{d-2}{d-1},$$

the Klein–Gordon field is said to be conformally coupled to gravity. When the conformally coupled field is also massless, the equation is conformally invariant. This case is often used as a particularly tractable model for a quantum field theory in curved spacetime calculations. In particular, for conformally flat spacetimes these fields do not experience any particle production due to the system being equivalent to a flat space theory.

=== Other equations ===
The Klein–Gordon equation is the equation of motion for free relativistic scalar field theories. Once self-interactions are introduced through a potential $V(\phi)$, the resulting equation of motion takes the form of a non-linear Klein–Gordon equation

$$(\square +m^2)\phi(x) = -\frac{\partial V}{\partial \phi}.$$

Notable examples include the sine-Gordon equation and the equation of motion for $\phi^4$ theory.

Interactions can also be introduced to the Klein–Gordon equation by gauging the scalar field under some gauge group. When it is gauged under a $\text{U}(1)$ group, then this leads to scalar electrodynamics, while when it is gauged under an $\text{SU}(N)$ group, the result is referred to as scalar chromodynamics. In generality, when gauged under some Lie group $G$, the Klein–Gordon equation takes the form

$$(D_\mu D^\mu +m^2)\Phi(x)=0,$$

where $\Phi(x)$ is a multicomponent scalar field belonging to some representation of the Lie group. This means that it transforms as $\Phi(x)\rightarrow \rho(g(x))\Phi(x)$, where $\rho(g)$ is a matrix representation of the group element $g \in G$. Meanwhile, gauge covariant derivative is defined as

$$D_\mu = \partial_\mu -igA_\mu^a T^a,$$

where $A_\mu^a$ are the components of the gauge field, corresponding to the connection, and $T^a$ are the generators in the representation of the Lie algebra corresponding to the Lie group representation $\rho(g)$.

The components of all non-interacting spin fields satisfy the Klein–Gordon equation either directly or once appropriate constraints are imposed. This is a group theoretic consequence, with all unitary irreducible representations of the Poincaré group satisfying the equation. For example, any solution of the Dirac equation, which describe spin-1/2 spinor fields, is automatically a solution of the Klein–Gordon equation. A similar result holds for the Maxwell equation and the Proca equation, describing spin-1 massless and massive fields $A^\mu$, respectively. Their component equations both reduce to the massless and massive Klein–Gordon equation once the constraint $\partial_\mu A^\mu = 0$ is imposed, which is a necessary constraint for the Proca equation while only a gauge choice of the Lorenz gauge for the Maxwell equation.

== See also ==
- Rarita–Schwinger equation
