= Lévy-Leblond equation =

Linearized quantum-mechanical equation

In quantum mechanics, the Lévy-Leblond equation describes the dynamics of a spin-1/2 particle. It is a linearized version of the Schrödinger equation and of the Pauli equation. It was derived by French physicist Jean-Marc Lévy-Leblond in 1967.

The Lévy-Leblond equation was obtained under similar heuristic derivations as the Dirac equation, but contrary to the latter, the Lévy-Leblond equation is not relativistic. As both equations recover the electron gyromagnetic ratio, it is suggested that spin is not necessarily a relativistic phenomenon.

== Equation ==
For a nonrelativistic spin-1/2 particle of mass m, a representation of the time-independent Lévy-Leblond equation reads:

$$\left\{\begin{matrix}
E\psi+(\boldsymbol \sigma \cdot \mathbf p c)\chi=0 \\
(\boldsymbol \sigma \cdot \mathbf pc )\psi + 2mc^2\chi=0\end{matrix}
\right.$$

where c is the speed of light, E is the nonrelativistic particle energy, $\mathbf p = -i\hbar \nabla$ is the momentum operator, and $\boldsymbol \sigma = (\sigma_x,\sigma_y,\sigma_z)$ is the vector of Pauli matrices, which is proportional to the spin operator $\mathbf S=\tfrac12\hbar \boldsymbol \sigma$. Here $\psi,\chi$ are two-component functions (spinors) describing the wave function of the particle.

By minimal coupling, the equation can be modified to account for the presence of an electromagnetic field,

$$\left\{\begin{matrix}
(E-q V)\psi+[\boldsymbol \sigma \cdot (\mathbf p-q\mathbf A)c]\chi=0 \\
{[\boldsymbol \sigma \cdot (\mathbf p-q \mathbf A ) c] } \psi + 2mc^2\chi = 0
\end{matrix}\right.$$

where q is the electric charge of the particle. V is the electric potential, and A is the magnetic vector potential. This equation is linear in its spatial derivatives.

== Relation to spin ==
In 1928, Paul Dirac linearized the relativistic dispersion relation and obtained what is now called the Dirac equation, described by a Dirac spinor. This equation can be decoupled into two spinors in the non-relativistic limit, providing an explanation of the electron magnetic moment with a gyromagnetic ratio $g=2$. This success of Dirac theory has led some textbooks to erroneously claim that spin is necessarily a relativistic phenomena.

Jean-Marc Lévy-Leblond applied the same technique to the non-relativistic energy relation showing that the same prediction of $g=2$ can be obtained. In fact, to derive the Pauli equation from the Dirac equation one has to pass by the Lévy-Leblond equation. Spin is then a result of quantum mechanics and linearization of the equations, but not necessarily a relativistic effect.

The Lévy-Leblond equation is Galilean invariant. This equation demonstrates that one does not need the full Poincaré group to explain some properties of spin 1/2 systems. In the classical limit where $c \to \infty$, quantum mechanics under the Galilean transformation group are enough. Similarly, one can construct a non-relativistic linear equation for any arbitrary spin. Under the same idea one can construct equations for Galilean electromagnetism.

== Relation to other equations ==
=== Schrödinger's and Pauli's equation ===
Taking the second line of the Lévy-Leblond equation and inserting it back into the first line, one obtains through the algebra of the Pauli matrices, that

$$\frac{1}{2m}(\boldsymbol \sigma \cdot \mathbf p)^2\psi-E\psi=\left[\frac{1}{2m} \mathbf p^2-E\right]\psi=0$$,

which is the Schrödinger equation for a two-valued spinor. Note that solving for $\chi$ also returns another Schrödinger's equation. Pauli's expression for spin-1/2 particle in an electromagnetic field can be recovered by minimal coupling:

$$\left\{\frac{1}{2m}[\boldsymbol \sigma \cdot (\mathbf p-q\mathbf A)]^2+qV\right\}\psi=E\psi$$.

While Lévy-Leblond is linear in its derivatives, Pauli's and Schrödinger's equations are quadratic in the spatial derivatives.

=== Dirac equation ===
The Dirac equation can be written as:

$$\left\{\begin{matrix}
(\mathcal{E}-mc^2)\psi+(\boldsymbol \sigma \cdot \mathbf p c)\chi=0 \\
(\boldsymbol \sigma \cdot \mathbf pc )\psi + (\mathcal{E}+ mc^2)\chi=0\end{matrix}
\right.$$

where $\mathcal{E}$ is the total relativistic energy. In the non-relativistic limit, $E\ll mc^2$ and $\mathcal{E}\approx mc^2+E+\cdots$ one recovers, Lévy-Leblond equations.

== Heuristic derivation ==
Similar to the historical derivation of the Dirac equation by Paul Dirac, one can try to linearize the non-relativistic dispersion relation $E=\frac{\mathbf p^2}{2m}$. We want two operators Θ and Θ' linear in $\mathbf p$ (spatial derivatives) and E, like

$$\left\{\begin{matrix}\Theta\Psi= [AE+\mathbf B\cdot \mathbf p c+2mc^2C]\Psi=0 \\
\Theta'\Psi= [A'E+\mathbf B'\cdot \mathbf p c+2mc^2C' ]\Psi=0 \end{matrix}
\right.$$

for some $A,A', \mathbf B=(B_x,B_y,B_z),\mathbf B'=(B_x',B_y',B_z'), C ,C'$, such that their product recovers the classical dispersion relation, that is

$$\frac{1}{2mc^2}\Theta'\Theta  =E-\frac{\mathbf p^2}{2m}$$,

where the factor 2mc^{2} is arbitrary, selected for correct normalization. By carrying out the product, one finds that there is no solution if $A,A',B_i, B_i', C ,C'$ are one-dimensional constants. The lowest dimension where there is a solution is 4. Then $A,A', \mathbf B, \mathbf B', C ,C'$ are matrices that must satisfy the following relations:

$$\left\{\begin{matrix}
A'A=0\\
C'C=0\\
A'B_i+B_i'A=0\\
C'B_i+B_i'C=0\\
A'C+C'A=I_4\\
B_i'B_j+B_j'B_i=-2\delta_{ij}
\end{matrix}\right.$$

these relations can be rearranged to involve the gamma matrices from Clifford algebra. $I_N$ is the Identity matrix of dimension N. One possible representation is

$$A=A'=\begin{pmatrix}0 & 0 \\ I_2 & 0\end{pmatrix}, B_i=-B_i'=\begin{pmatrix}\sigma_i & 0 \\ 0 & \sigma_i\end{pmatrix}, C=C'= \begin{pmatrix}0 & I_2 \\ 0 & 0\end{pmatrix}$$,

such that $\Theta\Psi=0$, with $\Psi=(\psi, \chi)$ , returns the Lévy-Leblond equation. Other representations can be chosen leading to equivalent equations with different signs or phases.
