= Null ideal =

Null ideal may refer to:

- The ideal of null sets in measure theory
- An ideal that is a pseudo-ring of square zero in ring theory
