= Markarian 382 =

Seyfert 1 galaxy in the constellation Lynx

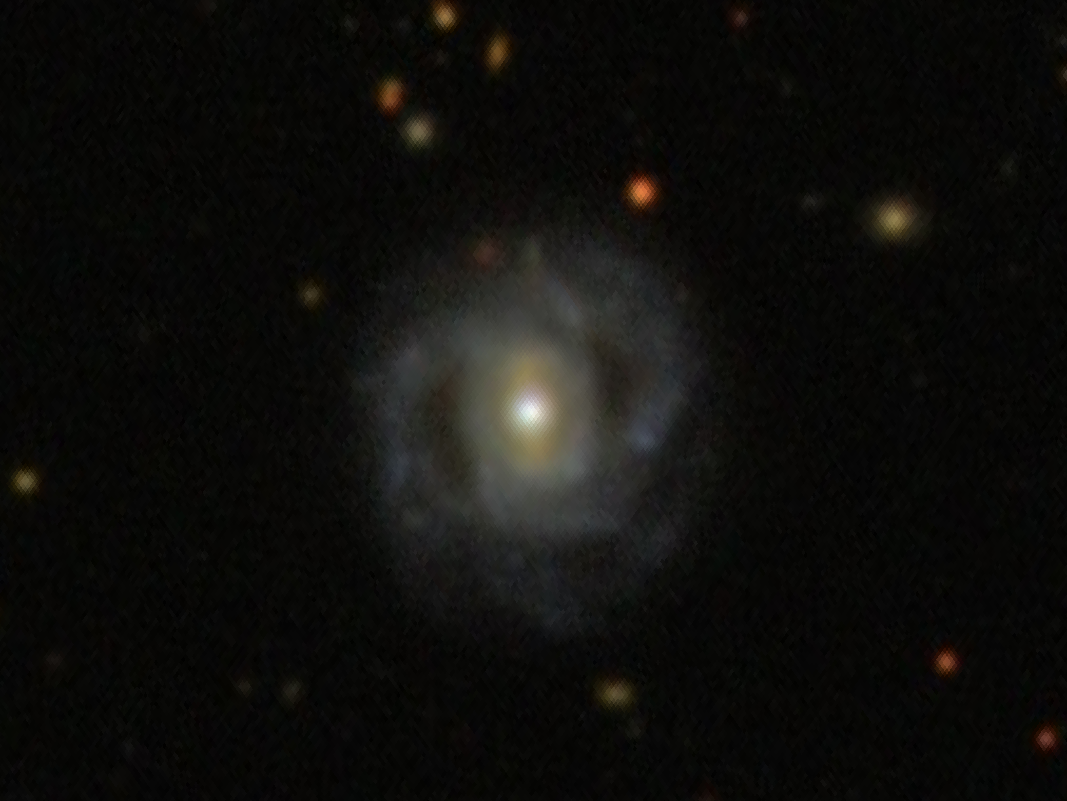
- SDSS image of Markarian 382

Observation data (J2000 epoch)
- Constellation: Lynx
- Right ascension: 07^{h} 55^{m} 25.29^{s}
- Declination: +39° 11′ 09.90″
- Redshift: 0.033165
- Heliocentric radial velocity: 9,943 km/s ± 14
- Distance: 474 Mly
- Apparent magnitude (V): 16.11
- Apparent magnitude (B): 16.45

Characteristics
- Type: Sc(r);Sy1 Sbrst
- Size: ~142,200 ly (43.61 kpc) (estimated)

Other designations
- CGCG 207-005, KIG 0214, PGC 22190, MCG +07-17-001, SIG 0319, UNAM-KIAS 0045, KUG 0752+393, IRAS F07520+3918, MRK 382

Markarian 382 is a Type 1 Seyfert galaxy with an active galactic nucleus, located in the constellation of Lynx. The redshift of the galaxy is (z) 0.0331 and it was first discovered in the 1415 GHz survey by A.G. de Bruyn and A.S. Wilson in November 1976. This galaxy has been classified as radio-quiet.

== Description ==
Markarian 382 has been specifically categorized as a narrow-line Seyfert galaxy. It is known to be X-ray variable with two flux states shown on high and low levels. When it underwent a high flux state, its optical spectrum has a soft appearance, which is mainly characterized by a low fractional variability state displayed in X-ray bands. When reaching a low flux state, the spectrum is the opposite.

The host galaxy of Markarian 382 is a barred spiral galaxy of type SBa based on imaging made with Hubble Space Telescope (HST), modeled by a single bulge and disk showing presence of spiral arms. When imaged, it is found to display a bar surrounded by a ring feature, with its spiral structure forming a pseudo-ring on its outer side. There is also a presence of a dust lane found to be curved and located northwest from the central bright nucleus, and also along the edge of a stellar bar.

The central supermassive black hole of Markarian 382 is estimated to be 0.90 ± 0.12 × 10^{7} M_{☉}. A study published in December 2022, has estimated the black hole as 6.50^{+0.19}_{-0.29} M_{☉} instead with an Eddington luminosity of 0.81 L_{Edd}. When observed in energy band, the X-ray spectrum contains two warm absorbing components with turbulent velocities of 100 and 100 kilometers per seconds.

An absorption system is found around Markarian 382. When observed, it is found to be made up of at least four velocity components. Upon further observations, there are two H I components classified as weak with measured column densities of around 10^{12.8} and 10^{13.3} cm^{−2} and blueshifted velocities of -62 and -228 kilometer per seconds. Doubly ionized silicon absorption has also been detected in additional.
