= Unitary =

Unitary may refer to:

== Mathematics ==
- Unitary divisor
- Unitary element
- Unitary group
- Unitary matrix
- Unitary morphism
- Unitary operator
- Unitary transformation
- Unitary representation
- Unitarity (physics)
- E-unitary inverse semigroup

== Politics ==
- Unitary authority
- Unitary state

== See also ==
- Unital (disambiguation)
- Unitarianism
