= Left and right (algebra) =

Relative position of an argument in a binary operator

s a s b s c s d s e s f s g …	a t b t c t d t e t f t g t …
Left multiplication by s and right multiplication by t. An abstract notation without any specific sense.

In algebra, the terms left and right denote the order of a binary operation (usually, but not always, called "multiplication") in non-commutative algebraic structures. A binary operation ∗ is usually written in the infix form:

s ∗ t

The argument s is placed on the left side, and the argument t is on the right side. Even if the symbol of the operation is omitted, the order of s and t does matter (unless ∗ is commutative).

A two-sided property is fulfilled on both sides. A one-sided property is related to one (unspecified) of two sides.

Although the terms are similar, left–right distinction in algebraic parlance is not related either to left and right limits in calculus, or to left and right in geometry.

== Binary operation as an operator ==
A binary operation ∗ may be considered as a family of unary operators through currying:

R_{t}(s) = s ∗ t,

depending on t as a parameter – this is the family of right operations. Similarly,

L_{s}(t) = s ∗ t

defines the family of left operations parametrized with s.

If for some e, the left operation L_{e} is the identity operation, then e is called a left identity. Similarly, if R_{e} = id, then e is a right identity.

In ring theory, a subring which is invariant under any left multiplication in a ring is called a left ideal. Similarly, a right multiplication-invariant subring is a right ideal.

== Left and right modules ==
Over non-commutative rings, the left–right distinction is applied to modules, namely to specify the side where a scalar (module element) appears in the scalar multiplication.

Left module	Right module
s(x + y) = sx + sy (s_{1} + s_{2})x = s_{1}x + s_{2}x s(tx) = (s t)x	(x + y)t = xt + yt x(t_{1} + t_{2}) = xt_{1} + xt_{2} (xs)t = x(s t)

The distinction is not purely syntactical because one gets two different associativity rules (the lowest row in the table) which link multiplication in a module with multiplication in a ring.

A bimodule is simultaneously a left and right module, with two different scalar multiplication operations, obeying an associativity condition on them.

== Other examples ==
- Left eigenvectors
- Left and right group actions

== In category theory ==
In category theory the usage of "left" and "right" has some algebraic resemblance, but refers to left and right sides of morphisms. See adjoint functors.

== See also ==
- Operator associativity
