= Jean-Marc Lévy-Leblond =

French physicist

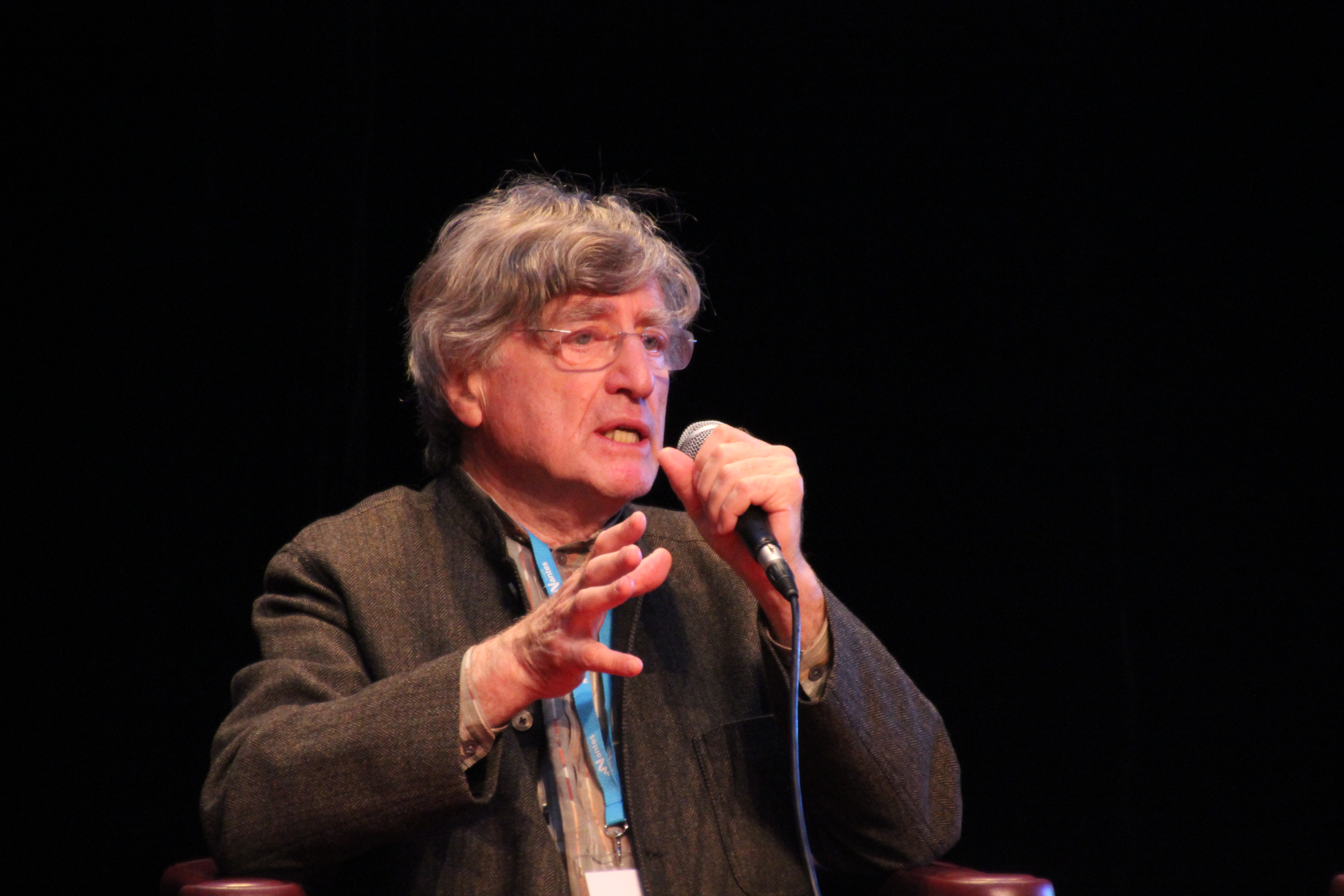
- Jean-Marc Lévy-Leblond at the 2013 Utopiales in Nantes
- Born: 16 May 1940 (age 85); Montpellier, France
- Education: École normale supérieure, Paris-Sud University (Ph.D.)
- Known for: Lévy-Leblond equation Galilean electromagnetism
- Awards: Ordre des Arts et des Lettres
- Scientific career
- Fields: Physics, science popularization, philosophy
- Institutions: Université Nice-Sophia-Antipolis

Jean-Marc Lévy-Leblond (born 1940) is a physicist and essayist.

== Biography ==
After high school in Cannes, Lévy-Leblond studied mathematics at the Lycée Janson-de-Sailly (Paris), then entered the École Normale Supérieure in 1958. A member of the Union of Communist Students (UEC) from 1956, then of the Communist Party, he left in 1968 to become one of the leaders of the movement of radical political criticism of science (see the journal Impasciences). After a doctorate (1962), then a doctorate in physical sciences (theoretical physics) at the University of Orsay in 1965, he was successively research fellow at the CNRS, lecturer at the University of Nice Sophia Antipolis, professor at the University of Paris 7, and at the University of Nice, where he taught in the departments of physics, philosophy and communication. He is professor emeritus at the University of Nice and was programme director at the Collège international de philosophie from 2001 to 2007.

He has published numerous articles on his research work, which mainly concerns theoretical and mathematical physics and epistemology.

He founded and directs the journal Alliage (culture, science, technique), directs the Science Ouverte and Points (science series) collections at Seuil, and works more generally to "(re )bringing science into culture”.

For a long time, Jean-Marc Lévy-Leblond has been sounding the alarm on the need for a public science intelligence, where knowledge, research, culture and politics would be tied together […]. In order to preserve authentic scientific discourse and avoid a gap of misunderstanding between specialists and the general public, but also to cultivate the need for a history of science, against the illusion of a universality of scientific knowledge, against the presentism and the fantasies of absolute contemporaneity, against the submission of science to industrial imperatives, against the planetary standardization that the domination of technosciences installs.

According to him

If these enemy brothers, scientism and irrationalism, prosper today, it is because uncultivated science becomes cult or occult with the same ease,

and the divorce between science and culture sometimes seems dangerously consummated. He has developed a discourse on the need for "science criticism", which he compares to art criticism, and calls for "a much higher level of collective consciousness on the part of society as a whole as to what scientific activity is”.

== Educational books ==
- Quantique (with Françoise Balibar), original textbook of quantum physics, published by Masson/CNRS. Volume 1 published in 1984, volume 2 unfinished, available online (archives-ouvertes.fr (CEL/CNRS)
- Physics in question, general physics exercises, in 2 volumes: 1. Mechanics, 2. Electricity and magnetism (Vuibert)
- Matter – relativistic, quantum, interactive, Paris, Seuil, 2006
- Richard Feynman, The Nature of Physics, trans. Jean-Marc Lévy-Leblond, Françoise Balibar, Paris, Seuil, 1980 (Points Sciences collection). ISBN 2-02-005658-5.

== Essayist and "critic of science" ==
- Director of the publication of the journal Alliage (culture, science, technique) ( ANAIS, since 1981)
- (Self) criticism of science (Texts brought together by Alain Jaubert and Jean-Marc Lévy-Leblond), Paris, Seuil, 1973
