= Pauli equation =

Quantum mechanical equation of motion of charged particles in magnetic field

In quantum mechanics, the Pauli equation or Schrödinger–Pauli equation is the formulation of the Schrödinger equation for spin-1/2 particles, which takes into account the interaction of the particle's spin with an external electromagnetic field. It is the non-relativistic limit of the Dirac equation and can be used where particles are moving at speeds much less than the speed of light, so that relativistic effects can be neglected. It was formulated by Wolfgang Pauli in 1927. In its linearized form it is known as Lévy-Leblond equation.

== Equation ==
For a particle of mass $m$ and electric charge $q$, in an electromagnetic field described by the magnetic vector potential $\mathbf{A}$ and the electric scalar potential $\phi$, the Pauli equation reads:

Pauli equation (general)

$\left[ \frac{1}{2m}(\boldsymbol{\sigma}\cdot(\mathbf{\hat{p}} - q \mathbf{A}))^2 + q \phi \right] |\psi\rangle = i \hbar \frac{\partial}{\partial t} |\psi\rangle$

Here $\boldsymbol{\sigma} = (\sigma_x, \sigma_y, \sigma_z)$ are the Pauli operators collected into a vector for convenience, and $\mathbf{\hat{p}} = -i\hbar \nabla$ is the momentum operator in position representation. The state of the system, $|\psi\rangle$ (written in Dirac notation), can be considered as a two-component spinor wavefunction, or a column vector (after choice of basis):

$$|\psi\rangle = \psi_+ |\mathord\uparrow\rangle + \psi_-|\mathord\downarrow\rangle \,\stackrel{\cdot}{=}\, \begin{bmatrix}
\psi_+ \\
\psi_-
\end{bmatrix}$$.

The Hamiltonian operator is a 2 × 2 matrix because of the Pauli operators.

$$\hat{H} = \frac{1}{2m} \left[\boldsymbol{\sigma}\cdot(\mathbf{\hat{p}} - q \mathbf{A}) \right]^2 + q \phi$$

Substitution into the Schrödinger equation gives the Pauli equation. This Hamiltonian is similar to the classical Hamiltonian for a charged particle interacting with an electromagnetic field. See Lorentz force for details of this classical case. The kinetic energy term for a free particle in the absence of an electromagnetic field is just $\frac{\mathbf{p}^2}{2m}$ where $\mathbf{p}$ is the kinetic momentum, while in the presence of an electromagnetic field it involves the minimal coupling $\mathbf{\Pi} = \mathbf{p} - q\mathbf{A}$, where now $\mathbf{\Pi}$ is the kinetic momentum and $\mathbf{p}$ is the canonical momentum.

The Pauli operators can be removed from the kinetic energy term using the Pauli vector identity:

$$(\boldsymbol{\sigma}\cdot \mathbf{a})(\boldsymbol{\sigma}\cdot \mathbf{b}) =  \mathbf{a}\cdot\mathbf{b} + i\boldsymbol{\sigma}\cdot \left(\mathbf{a} \times \mathbf{b}\right)$$

Note that unlike a vector, the differential operator $\mathbf{\hat{p}} - q\mathbf{A} = -i \hbar \nabla - q \mathbf{A}$ has non-zero cross product with itself. This can be seen by considering the cross product applied to a scalar function $\psi$:

$$\begin{align}
\left[\left(\mathbf{\hat{p}} - q\mathbf{A}\right) \times \left(\mathbf{\hat{p}} - q\mathbf{A}\right)\right]\psi &= -q \left[\mathbf{\hat{p}} \times \left(\mathbf{A}\psi\right) + \mathbf{A} \times \left(\mathbf{\hat{p}}\psi\right)\right]\\
&= i q \hbar \left[\nabla \times \left(\mathbf{A}\psi\right) + \mathbf{A} \times \left(\nabla\psi\right)\right]\\
&= i q \hbar \left[\psi\left(\nabla \times \mathbf{A}\right) - \mathbf{A} \times \left(\nabla\psi\right) + \mathbf{A} \times \left(\nabla\psi\right)\right] = i q \hbar \mathbf{B} \psi
\end{align}$$

where $\mathbf{B} = \nabla \times \mathbf{A}$ is the magnetic field.

For the full Pauli equation, one then obtains

Pauli equation (standard form)

$\hat{H} |\psi\rangle = \left[\frac{1}{2m}\left[\left(\mathbf{\hat{p}} - q \mathbf{A}\right)^2 - q \hbar \boldsymbol{\sigma}\cdot \mathbf{B}\right] + q \phi\right]|\psi\rangle = i \hbar \frac{\partial}{\partial t} |\psi\rangle$

for which only a few analytic results are known, e.g., in the context of Landau quantization with homogenous magnetic fields or for an idealized, Coulomb-like, inhomogeneous magnetic field.

=== Weak magnetic fields ===
For the case of where the magnetic field is constant and homogenous, one may expand $(\mathbf{\hat{p}}-q\mathbf{A})^2$ using the symmetric gauge $\mathbf{\hat{A}}=\frac{1}{2}\mathbf{B}\times\mathbf{\hat{r}}$, where $\mathbf{r}$ is the position operator and A is now an operator. We obtain

$$(\mathbf \hat{p}-q \mathbf \hat{A})^2 = |\mathbf{\hat{p}}|^{2} - q(\mathbf{\hat{r}}\times\mathbf \hat{p})\cdot \mathbf{B} +\frac{1}{4}q^2\left(|\mathbf{B}|^2|\mathbf{\hat{r}}|^2-|\mathbf{B}\cdot\mathbf{\hat{r}}|^2\right) \approx \mathbf{\hat{p}}^{2} - q\mathbf \hat{L}\cdot\mathbf B\,,$$

where $\mathbf{\hat{L}}$ is the particle angular momentum operator and we neglected terms in the magnetic field squared $B^2$. Therefore, we obtain

Pauli equation (weak magnetic fields)

$\left[\frac{1}{2m}\left[|\mathbf{\hat{p}}|^2 - q (\mathbf{\hat{L}}+2\mathbf{\hat{S}})\cdot\mathbf{B}\right] + q \phi\right]|\psi\rangle = i \hbar \frac{\partial}{\partial t} |\psi\rangle$

where $\mathbf{S}=\hbar\boldsymbol{\sigma}/2$ is the spin of the particle. The factor 2 in front of the spin is known as the Dirac g-factor. The term in $\mathbf{B}$, is of the form $-\boldsymbol{\mu}\cdot\mathbf{B}$ which is the usual interaction between a magnetic moment $\boldsymbol{\mu}$ and a magnetic field, like in the Zeeman effect.

For an electron of charge $-e$ in an isotropic constant magnetic field, one can further reduce the equation using the total angular momentum $\mathbf{J}=\mathbf{L}+\mathbf{S}$ and Wigner-Eckart theorem. Thus we find

$$\left[\frac{|\mathbf{p}|^2}{2m} + \mu_{\rm B} g_J m_j|\mathbf{B}| - e \phi\right]|\psi\rangle = i \hbar \frac{\partial}{\partial t} |\psi\rangle$$

where $\mu_{\rm B}=\frac{e\hbar }{2m}$ is the Bohr magneton and $m_j$ is the magnetic quantum number related to $\mathbf{J}$. The term $g_J$ is known as the Landé g-factor, and is given here by

$g_J = \frac{3}{2}+\frac{\frac{3}{4}-\ell(\ell+1)}{2j(j+1)},$ (Note: The formula used here is for a particle with spin-1/2, with a g-factor $g_S=2$ and orbital g-factor $g_L=1$. More generally it is given by:$g_J = \frac{3}{2}+\frac{m_s(m_s+1)-\ell(\ell+1)}{2j(j+1)}.$ where $m_s$ is the spin quantum number related to $\hat{S}$.)

where $\ell$ is the orbital quantum number related to $L^2$ and $j$ is the total orbital quantum number related to $J^2$.

== From Dirac equation ==
The Pauli equation can be inferred from the non-relativistic limit of the Dirac equation, which is the relativistic quantum equation of motion for spin-1/2 particles.

=== Derivation ===
The Dirac equation can be written as:
$$i \hbar\, \partial_t \begin{pmatrix} \psi_1 \\ \psi_2\end{pmatrix} = c \, \begin{pmatrix} \boldsymbol{ \sigma}\cdot \boldsymbol \Pi \,\psi_2 \\ \boldsymbol{\sigma}\cdot \boldsymbol \Pi \,\psi_1\end{pmatrix} + q\, \phi \, \begin{pmatrix} \psi_1 \\ \psi_2\end{pmatrix} + mc^2\, \begin{pmatrix} \psi_1 \\ -\psi_2\end{pmatrix} ,$$

where $\partial_t=\frac{\partial}{\partial t}$ and $\psi_1,\psi_2$ are two-component spinors, forming a Dirac spinor.

Using the following ansatz:
$$\begin{pmatrix} \psi_1 \\ \psi_2 \end{pmatrix} = e^{- i \tfrac{mc^2t}{\hbar}} \begin{pmatrix} \psi \\ \chi \end{pmatrix} ,$$
with two new spinors $\psi,\chi$, the equation becomes
$$i \hbar \partial_t \begin{pmatrix} \psi \\ \chi\end{pmatrix} = c \, \begin{pmatrix} \boldsymbol{ \sigma}\cdot \boldsymbol \Pi \,\chi\\ \boldsymbol{\sigma}\cdot \boldsymbol \Pi \,\psi\end{pmatrix} +q\, \phi \, \begin{pmatrix} \psi\\ \chi \end{pmatrix} + \begin{pmatrix} 0  \\ -2\,mc^2\, \chi \end{pmatrix} .$$

In the non-relativistic limit, $\partial_t \chi$ and the kinetic and electrostatic energies are small with respect to the rest energy $mc^2$, leading to the Lévy-Leblond equation. Thus
$$\chi \approx \frac{\boldsymbol \sigma \cdot \boldsymbol{\Pi}\,\psi}{2\,mc}\,.$$

Using this approximation, the upper component of the Dirac equation becomes the general form of the Pauli equation:
$$i \hbar\, \partial_t \, \psi=  \left[\frac{(\boldsymbol \sigma \cdot \boldsymbol \Pi)^2}{2\,m}
+q\, \phi\right] \psi.$$

=== From a Foldy–Wouthuysen transformation ===
The rigorous derivation of the Pauli equation follows from Dirac equation in an external field and performing a Foldy–Wouthuysen transformation considering terms up to order $\mathcal{O}(1/mc)$. Similarly, higher order corrections to the Pauli equation can be determined giving rise to spin-orbit and Darwin interaction terms, when expanding up to order $\mathcal{O}(1/(mc)^2)$ instead.

== Pauli coupling ==
Pauli's equation is derived by requiring minimal coupling, which provides a g-factor g=2. Most elementary particles have anomalous g-factors, different from 2. In the domain of relativistic quantum field theory, one defines a non-minimal coupling, sometimes called Pauli coupling, in order to add an anomalous factor

$$\gamma^{\mu}p_\mu\to \gamma^{\mu}p_\mu-q\gamma^{\mu}A_\mu +a\sigma_{\mu\nu}F^{\mu\nu}$$

where $p_\mu$ is the four-momentum operator, $A_\mu$ is the electromagnetic four-potential, $a$ is proportional to the anomalous magnetic dipole moment, $F^{\mu\nu}=\partial^{\mu}A^{\nu}-\partial^{\nu}A^{\mu}$ is the electromagnetic tensor, and $\sigma_{\mu\nu}=\frac{i}{2}[\gamma_{\mu},\gamma_{\nu}]$ are the Lorentzian spin matrices and the commutator of the gamma matrices $\gamma^{\mu}$. In the context of non-relativistic quantum mechanics, instead of working with the Schrödinger equation, Pauli coupling is equivalent to using the Pauli equation (or postulating Zeeman energy) for an arbitrary g-factor.

== See also ==
- Semiclassical physics
- Atomic, molecular, and optical physics
- Group contraction
- Gordon decomposition
