= Galilean electromagnetism =

Galilean electromagnetism is a formal electromagnetic field theory that is consistent with Galilean invariance. Galilean electromagnetism is useful for describing the electric and magnetic fields in the vicinity of charged bodies moving at non-relativistic speeds relative to the frame of reference. The resulting mathematical equations are simpler than the fully relativistic forms because certain coupling terms are neglected. (Note: "For the experiments of electrodynamics of moving bodies with low speeds, the Galilean theory is the most adapted because it is easier of stake in work from the calculus point of view and does not bring in the kinematics effect of Special Relativity which are absolutely unimportant in the Galilean limit.")

In electrical networks, Galilean electromagnetism provides possible tools to derive the equations used in low-frequency approximations in order to quantify the current crossing a capacitor or the voltage induced in a coil. As such, Galilean electromagnetism can be used to regroup and explain the somehow dynamic but non-relativistic quasistatic approximations of Maxwell's equations.

== Overview ==
In 1905 Albert Einstein made use of the non-Galilean character of Maxwell's equations to develop his theory of special relativity. The special property embedded in Maxwell's equations is known as the Lorentz invariance. In Maxwell's equations frame, assuming that the speed of moving charges is small compared to the speed of light, it is possible to derive approximations that fulfill Galilean invariance. This approach enables the rigorous definition of two main mutually exclusive limits known as quasi-electrostatics (electrostatics with displacement currents or ohmic currents) and quasi-magnetostatics (magnetostatics with electric field caused by variation of magnetic field according to Faraday's law, or by ohmic currents). Quasi-static approximations are often poorly introduced in literature as stated for instance in Hermann A. Hauss and James R. Melcher's book. They are often presented as a single one whereas Galilean electromagnetism shows that the two regimes are in general mutually exclusive. According to Germain Rousseaux, the existence of these two exclusive limits explains why electromagnetism has long been thought to be incompatible with Galilean transformations. However Galilean transformations applying in both cases (magnetic limit and electric limit) were known by engineers before the topic was discussed by Jean-Marc Lévy-Leblond. These transformations are found in H. H. Woodson and Melcher's 1968 book. (Note: "According to us, the oldest reference to them is the book by Woodson and Melcher in 1968")

If the transit time of the electromagnetic wave passing through the system is much less than a typical time scale of the system, then Maxwell equations can be reduced to one of the Galilean limits. For instance, for dielectrical liquids it is quasielectrostatics, and for highly conducting liquids quasimagnetostatics.

== History ==
Electromagnetism followed a reverse path compared to mechanics. In mechanics, the laws were first derived by Isaac Newton in their Galilean form. They had to wait for Albert Einstein and his special relativity theory to take a relativistic form. Einstein has then allowed a generalization of Newton's laws of motion to describe the trajectories of bodies moving at relativistic speeds. In the electromagnetic frame, James Clerk Maxwell directly derived the equations in their relativistic form, although this property had to wait for Hendrik Lorentz and Einstein to be discovered.

As late as 1963, Edward Mills Purcell's Electricity and Magnetism (Note: Note: Purcell uses electrostatic units, so the constants are different. This is the MKS version.) offered the following low velocity transformations as suitable for calculating the electric field experienced by a jet plane travelling in the Earth's magnetic field.

$$E' = E + v  \times B  .$$

$$B' = B - \epsilon_0  \mu_0  v  \times E  .$$

In 1973 Michel Le Bellac and Jean-Marc Lévy-Leblond state that these equations are incorrect or misleading because they do not correspond to any consistent Galilean limit. Germain Rousseaux gives a simple example showing that a transformation from an initial inertial frame to a second frame with a speed of v_{0} with respect to the first frame and then to a third frame moving with a speed v_{1} with respect to the second frame would give a result different from going directly from the first frame to the third frame using a relative speed of (v_{0} + v_{1}).

Le Bellac and Lévy-Leblond offer two transformations that do have consistent Galilean limits as follows:

The electric limit applies when electric field effects are dominant such as when Faraday's law of induction was insignificant.

$$E' = E  .$$

$$B' = B - \epsilon_0  \mu_0  v  \times E .$$

The magnetic limit applies when the magnetic field effects are dominant.

$$E' = E + v  \times B  .$$

$$B' = B .$$

John David Jackson's Classical Electrodynamics introduces a Galilean transformation for the Faraday's equation and gives an example of a quasi-electrostatic case that also fulfills a Galilean transformation. Jackson states that the wave equation is not invariant under Galilean transformations.

In 2013, Rousseaux published a review and summary of Galilean electromagnetism.
