= Scalar electrodynamics =

Electrodynamics of spin 0 particles

In theoretical physics, scalar electrodynamics is a theory of a U(1) gauge field coupled to a charged spin 0 scalar field that takes the place of the Dirac fermions in "ordinary" quantum electrodynamics. The scalar field is charged, and with an appropriate potential, it has the capacity to break the gauge symmetry via the Abelian Higgs mechanism.

== Matter content and Lagrangian ==
=== Matter content ===
The model consists of a complex scalar field $\phi(x)$ minimally coupled to a gauge field $A_\mu(x)$.

This article discusses the theory on flat spacetime $\mathbb{R}^{1,3}$ (Minkowski space) so these fields can be treated (naïvely) as functions $\phi:\mathbb{R}^{1,3}\rightarrow \mathbb{C}$, and $A_\mu:\mathbb{R}^{1,3}\rightarrow (\mathbb{R}^{1,3})^*$. The theory can also be defined for curved spacetime but these definitions must be replaced with a more subtle one. The gauge field is also known as a principal connection, specifically a principal $\text{U}(1)$ connection.

=== Lagrangian ===
The dynamics is given by the Lagrangian density

$\begin{array}{lcl} \mathcal{L} & = & (D_\mu \phi)^* D^\mu \phi - V(\phi^*\phi) -\frac14 F_{\mu\nu}F^{\mu\nu} \\ & = & (\partial_\mu \phi)^*(\partial^\mu \phi)-ie((\partial_\mu \phi)^*\phi-\phi^*(\partial_\mu \phi))A^\mu +e^2A_\mu A^\mu\phi^*\phi - V(\phi^*\phi) -\frac14 F_{\mu\nu}F^{\mu\nu} \end{array}$

where

- $F_{\mu\nu}=(\partial_\mu A_\nu - \partial_\nu A_\mu)$ is the electromagnetic field strength, or curvature of the connection.
- $D_\mu\phi=(\partial_\mu \phi - i e A_\mu \phi)$ is the covariant derivative of the field $\phi$
- $e = -|e|<0$ is the electric charge
- $V(\phi^*\phi)$ is the potential for the complex scalar field.

=== Gauge-invariance ===
This model is invariant under gauge transformations parameterized by $\lambda(x)$. This is a real-valued function $\lambda: \mathbb{R}^{1,3}\rightarrow \mathbb{R}.$

$\phi'(x) = e^{ie \lambda(x)}\phi(x)\quad\textrm{and}\quad A_\mu'(x)=A_\mu(x)+\partial_\mu \lambda(x).$

==== Differential-geometric view ====
From the geometric viewpoint, $\lambda$ is an infinitesimal change of trivialization, which generates the finite change of trivialization $e^{ie\lambda}:\mathbb{R}^{1,3}\rightarrow \text{U}(1).$ In physics, it is customary to work under an implicit choice of trivialization, hence a gauge transformation really can be viewed as a change of trivialization.

== Higgs mechanism ==
If the potential is such that its minimum occurs at non-zero value of $|\phi|$, this model exhibits the Higgs mechanism. This can be seen by studying fluctuations about the lowest energy configuration: one sees that the gauge field behaves as a massive field with its mass proportional to $e$ times the minimum value of $|\phi|$. As shown in 1973 by Nielsen and Olesen, this model, in $2+1$ dimensions, admits time-independent finite energy configurations corresponding to vortices carrying magnetic flux. The magnetic flux carried by these vortices are quantized (in units of $\tfrac{2\pi}{e}$) and appears as a topological charge associated with the topological current

$J_{top}^\mu =\epsilon^{\mu\nu\rho} F_{\nu\rho}\ .$

These vortices are similar to the vortices appearing in type-II superconductors. This analogy was used by Nielsen and Olesen in obtaining their solutions.

=== Example ===
A simple choice of potential for demonstrating the Higgs mechanism is

$$V(|\phi|^2) = \lambda(|\phi|^2 - \Phi^2)^2.$$

The potential is minimized at $|\phi| = \Phi$, which is chosen to be greater than zero. This produces a circle of minima, with values $\Phi e^{i\theta}$, for $\theta$ a real number.

== Scalar chromodynamics ==
This theory can be generalized from a theory with $U(1)$ gauge symmetry containing a scalar field $\phi$ valued in $\mathbb{C}$ coupled to a gauge field $A_\mu$ to a theory with gauge symmetry under the gauge group $G$, a Lie group.

The scalar field $\phi$ is valued in a representation space of the gauge group $G$, making it a vector; the label of "scalar" field refers only to the transformation of $\phi$ under the action of the Lorentz group, so it is still referred to as a scalar field, in the sense of a Lorentz scalar. The gauge-field is a $\mathfrak{g}$-valued 1-form, where $\mathfrak{g}$ is the Lie algebra of G.
