= Pseudo-ring =

In mathematics, and more specifically in abstract algebra, a pseudo-ring is one of the following variants of a ring:

- A rng, i.e., a structure satisfying all the axioms of a ring except for the existence of a multiplicative identity.
- A set R with two binary operations + and ⋅ such that (R, +) is an abelian group with identity 0, and a(b + c) + a0 = ab + ac and (b + c)a + 0a = ba + ca for all a, b, c in R.
- An abelian group (A, +) equipped with a subgroup B and a multiplication B × A → A making B a ring and A a B-module.

None of these definitions are equivalent, so it is best to avoid the term "pseudo-ring" or to clarify which meaning is intended.

== See also ==
- Semiring – an algebraic structure similar to a ring, but without the requirement that each element must have an additive inverse
