= Unital =

Unital may refer to:

- A unital algebra – an algebra that contains a multiplicative identity element.
- A unital magma – a magma with an identity element.
- A geometric unital – a 2-(n^{3} + 1, n + 1, 1) block design for integer n ≥ 3.
- A unital algebraic structure, such as a unital magma.
- A unital map on C*-algebras – a map that preserves the identity element.
