= Gaussian surface =

Closed surface in three-dimensional space

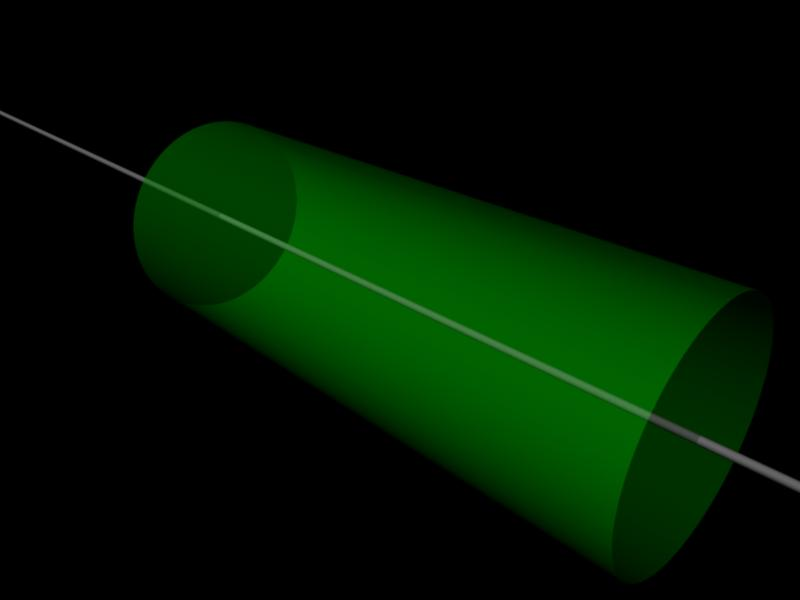
A cylindrical Gaussian surface is commonly used to calculate the electric charge of an infinitely long, straight, 'ideal' wire.

A Gaussian surface is a closed surface in three-dimensional space through which the flux of a vector field is calculated; usually the gravitational field, electric field, or magnetic field. It is an arbitrary closed surface S = ∂V (the boundary of a 3-dimensional region V) used in conjunction with Gauss's law for the corresponding field (Gauss's law, Gauss's law for magnetism, or Gauss's law for gravity) by performing a surface integral, in order to calculate the total amount of the source quantity enclosed; e.g., amount of gravitational mass as the source of the gravitational field or amount of electric charge as the source of the electrostatic field, or vice versa: calculate the fields for the source distribution.

For concreteness, the electric field is considered in this article, as this is the most frequent type of field the surface concept is used for.

Gaussian surfaces are usually carefully chosen to match symmetries of a situation to simplify the calculation of the surface integral. If the Gaussian surface is chosen such that for every point on the surface the component of the electric field along the normal vector is constant, then the calculation will not require difficult integration as the constants which arise can be taken out of the integral.

== Common Gaussian surfaces ==
Examples of valid (left) and invalid (right) Gaussian surfaces. Left: Some valid Gaussian surfaces include the surface of a sphere, surface of a torus, and surface of a cube. They are closed surfaces that fully enclose a 3D volume. Right: Some surfaces that CANNOT be used as Gaussian surfaces, such as the disk surface, square surface, or hemisphere surface. They do not fully enclose a 3D volume, and have boundaries (red). Note that infinite planes can approximate Gaussian surfaces.

Most calculations using Gaussian surfaces begin by implementing Gauss's law (for electricity):

$\Phi_E =$ $\scriptstyle S$ $\mathbf E\;\cdot\mathrm{d}\mathbf A = \frac{Q_{\text{enc}}}{\varepsilon_0}.$

Thereby Q_{enc} is the electrical charge enclosed by the Gaussian surface.

This is Gauss's law, combining both the divergence theorem and Coulomb's law.

=== Spherical surface ===
A spherical Gaussian surface is used when finding the electric field or the flux produced by any of the following:

- a point charge
- a uniformly distributed spherical shell of charge
- any other charge distribution with spherical symmetry

The spherical Gaussian surface is chosen so that it is concentric with the charge distribution.

As an example, consider a charged spherical shell S of negligible thickness, with a uniformly distributed charge Q and radius R. We can use Gauss's law to find the magnitude of the resultant electric field E at a distance r from the center of the charged shell. It is immediately apparent that for a spherical Gaussian surface of radius r < R the enclosed charge is zero: hence the net flux is zero and the magnitude of the electric field on the Gaussian surface is also 0 (by letting Q_{A} = 0 in Gauss's law, where Q_{A} is the charge enclosed by the Gaussian surface).

With the same example, using a larger Gaussian surface outside the shell where r > R, Gauss's law will produce a non-zero electric field. This is determined as follows.

The flux out of the spherical surface S is:

$\Phi_E =$ $\scriptstyle \partial S$ $\mathbf{E}\cdot d \mathbf{A} = \iint_c E dA\cos 0^\circ = E \iint_S dA$

The surface area of the sphere of radius r is
$$\iint_S dA = 4 \pi r^2$$
which implies
$$\Phi_E = E 4\pi r^2$$

By Gauss's law the flux is also
$$\Phi_E =\frac{Q_A}{\varepsilon_0}$$
finally equating the expression for Φ_{E} gives the magnitude of the E-field at position r:
$$E 4\pi r^2 = \frac{Q_A}{\varepsilon_0} \quad \Rightarrow \quad E=\frac{Q_A}{4\pi\varepsilon_0r^2}.$$

This non-trivial result shows that any spherical distribution of charge acts as a point charge when observed from the outside of the charge distribution; this is in fact a verification of Coulomb's law. And, as mentioned, any exterior charges do not count.

=== Cylindrical surface ===
A cylindrical Gaussian surface is used when finding the electric field or the flux produced by any of the following:

- an infinitely long line of uniform charge
- an infinite plane of uniform charge
- an infinitely long cylinder of uniform charge

As example "field near infinite line charge" is given below;

Consider a point P at a distance r from an infinite line charge having charge density (charge per unit length) λ. Imagine a closed surface in the form of cylinder whose axis of rotation is the line charge. If h is the length of the cylinder, then the charge enclosed in the cylinder is
$$q = \lambda h ,$$
where q is the charge enclosed in the Gaussian surface. There are three surfaces a, b and c as shown in the figure. The differential vector area is dA, on each surface a, b and c.

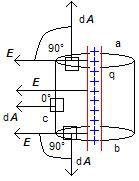
Closed surface in the form of a cylinder having line charge in the center and showing differential areas dA of all three surfaces.

The flux passing consists of the three contributions:

$\Phi_E =$ $\scriptstyle A$ $\mathbf{E} \cdot d\mathbf{A} = \iint_a \mathbf{E} \cdot d\mathbf{A} + \iint_b\mathbf{E} \cdot d\mathbf{A} + \iint_c\mathbf{E} \cdot d\mathbf{A}$

For surfaces a and b, E and dA will be perpendicular. For surface c, E and dA will be parallel, as shown in the figure.

$$\begin{align}
\Phi_E & = \iint_a E dA\cos 90^\circ + \iint_b E d A \cos 90^\circ + \iint_c E d A\cos 0^\circ \\
& = E \iint_c dA
\end{align}$$

The surface area of the cylinder is
$$\iint_c dA = 2 \pi r h$$
which implies
$$\Phi_E = E 2 \pi r h.$$

By Gauss's law
$$\Phi_E = \frac{q}{\varepsilon_0}$$
equating for Φ_{E} yields
$$E 2 \pi rh = \frac{\lambda h}{\varepsilon_0} \quad \Rightarrow \quad E = \frac{\lambda}{2 \pi\varepsilon_0 r}$$

=== Gaussian pillbox ===
This surface is most often used to determine the electric field due to an infinite sheet of charge with uniform charge density, or a slab of charge with some finite thickness. The pillbox has a cylindrical shape, and can be thought of as consisting of three components: the disk at one end of the cylinder with area πR^{2}, the disk at the other end with equal area, and the side of the cylinder. The sum of the electric flux through each component of the surface is proportional to the enclosed charge of the pillbox, as dictated by Gauss's law. Because the field close to the sheet can be approximated as constant, the pillbox is oriented in a way so that the field lines penetrate the disks at the ends of the field at a perpendicular angle and the side of the cylinder are parallel to the field lines.

== See also ==
- Area
- Surface area
- Vector calculus
- Integration
- Divergence theorem
- Faraday cage
- Field theory
- Field line
