= Electric flux =

Measure of electric field through surface

- Common symbols: Φ_{E}
- SI unit: volt-meter (V⋅m)
- In SI base units: kg⋅m^{3}⋅s^{−3}⋅A^{−1}
- Dimension: M L^{3} T^{−3} I^{−1}

In electromagnetism, electric flux is the total electric field that crosses a given surface. The electric flux through a closed surface is directly proportional to the total charge contained within that surface.

The electric field E can exert a force on an electric charge at any point in space. The electric field is the gradient of the electric potential.

== Overview ==
An electric charge, such as a single electron in space, has an electric field surrounding it. In pictorial form, this electric field is shown as "lines of flux" being radiated from a dot (the charge). These are called Gauss lines. Note that field lines are a graphic illustration of field strength and direction and have no physical meaning as isolated lines. The density of these lines corresponds to the electric field strength, which could also be called the electric flux density: the number of "lines" per unit area. Electric flux is directly proportional to the total number of electric field lines going through a surface. For simplicity in calculations it is often convenient to consider a surface perpendicular to the flux lines. If the electric field is uniform, the electric flux passing through a surface of vector area A is
$$\Phi_\text{E} = \mathbf{E} \cdot \mathbf{A} = EA \cos \theta,$$
where E is the electric field (having the unit V/m), E is its magnitude, A is the area of the surface, and θ is the angle between the electric field lines and the normal (perpendicular) to A.

For a non-uniform electric field, the electric flux dΦ_{E} through a small surface area dA is given by
$$\textrm{d}\Phi_\text{E} = \mathbf{E} \cdot \textrm d\mathbf{A}$$
(the electric field, E, multiplied by the component of area perpendicular to the field). The electric flux over a surface is therefore given by the surface integral:
$$\Phi_\text{E} = \iint_S \mathbf{E} \cdot \textrm{d}\mathbf{A}$$
where E is the electric field and dA is an infinitesimal area on the surface with an outward facing surface normal defining its direction.

For a closed Gaussian surface, electric flux is given by:

$\Phi_\text{E} =\,\!$ $\scriptstyle S$ $\mathbf{E}\cdot \textrm{d}\mathbf{A} = \frac{Q}{\varepsilon_0}\,\!$

where

- E is the electric field,
- dA is an infinitesimal area on the closed surface,
- Q is the total electric charge inside the surface,
- ε_{0} is the electric constant (a universal constant, also called the permittivity of free space) (ε_{0} ≈ 8.854187817×10^{−12} F/m)

This relation is known as Gauss's law for electric fields in its integral form and it is one of Maxwell's equations.

While the electric flux is not affected by charges that are not within the closed surface, the net electric field, E can be affected by charges that lie outside the closed surface. While Gauss's law holds for all situations, it is most useful for "by hand" calculations when high degrees of symmetry exist in the electric field. Examples include spherical and cylindrical symmetry.

The SI unit of electric flux is the volt-meter (V·m), or, equivalently, newton-meter squared per coulomb (N·m^{2}·C^{−1}). Thus, the unit of electric flux expressed in terms of SI base units is kg·m^{3}·s^{−3}·A^{−1}. Its dimensional formula is L^{3}MT^{−3}I^{−1}.

== See also ==
- Magnetic flux
- Maxwell's equations
- Electric field
- Magnetic field
- Electromagnetic field
