= Surface integral =

Integration over a non-flat region in 3D space

The definition of the surface integral relies on splitting the surface into small surface elements.

In mathematics, particularly multivariable calculus, a surface integral is a generalization of multiple integrals to integration over surfaces. It can be thought of as the double integral analogue of the line integral. Given a surface, one may integrate over this surface a scalar field (that is, a function of position which returns a scalar as a value), or a vector field (that is, a function which returns a vector as value). If a region R is not flat, then it is called a surface as shown in the illustration.

Surface integrals have applications in physics, particularly in the classical theories of electromagnetism and fluid mechanics.

An illustration of a single surface element. These elements are made infinitesimally small, by the limiting process, so as to approximate the surface.

== Surface integrals of scalar fields ==
Assume that f is a scalar, vector, or tensor field defined on a surface S. To find an explicit formula for the surface integral of f over S, we need to parameterize S by defining a system of curvilinear coordinates on S, like the latitude and longitude on a sphere. Let such a parameterization be r(s, t), where (s, t) varies in some region T in the plane. Then, the surface integral is given by

$$\iint_S f \,\mathrm dS
= \iint_T f(\mathbf{r}(s, t)) \left\|{\partial \mathbf{r} \over \partial s} \times {\partial \mathbf{r} \over \partial t}\right\| \mathrm ds\, \mathrm dt$$

where the expression between bars on the right-hand side is the magnitude of the cross product of the partial derivatives of r(s, t), and is known as the surface element (which would, for example, yield a smaller value near the poles of a sphere, where the lines of longitude converge more dramatically, and latitudinal coordinates are more compactly spaced). The surface integral can also be expressed in the equivalent form

$$\iint_S f \,\mathrm dS
= \iint_T f(\mathbf{r}(s, t)) \sqrt{g} \, \mathrm ds\, \mathrm dt$$

where g is the determinant of the first fundamental form of the surface mapping r(s, t).

For example, if we want to find the surface area of the graph of some scalar function, say z = f(x, y), we have

$$A = \iint_S \,\mathrm dS
= \iint_T \left\|{\partial \mathbf{r} \over \partial x} \times {\partial \mathbf{r} \over \partial y}\right\| \mathrm dx\, \mathrm dy$$

where r = (x, y, z) = (x, y, f(x, y)). So that ${\partial \mathbf{r} \over \partial x}=(1, 0, f_x(x,y))$, and ${\partial \mathbf{r} \over \partial y}=(0, 1, f_y(x,y))$. So,

$$\begin{align}
A
&{} = \iint_T \left\|\left(1, 0, {\partial f \over \partial x}\right)\times \left(0, 1, {\partial f \over \partial y}\right)\right\| \mathrm dx\, \mathrm dy \\
&{} = \iint_T \left\|\left(-{\partial f \over \partial x}, -{\partial f \over \partial y}, 1\right)\right\| \mathrm dx\, \mathrm dy \\
&{} = \iint_T \sqrt{\left({\partial f \over \partial x}\right)^2+\left({\partial f \over \partial y}\right)^2+1}\, \,  \mathrm dx\, \mathrm dy
\end{align}$$

which is the standard formula for the area of a surface described this way. One can recognize the vector in the second-last line above as the normal vector to the surface.

Because of the presence of the cross product, the above formulas only work for surfaces embedded in three-dimensional space.

This can be seen as integrating a Riemannian volume form on the parameterized surface, where the metric tensor is given by the first fundamental form of the surface.

== Surface integrals of vector fields ==
A curved surface $S$ with a vector field $\mathbf{F}$ passing through it. The red arrows (vectors) represent the magnitude and direction of the field at various points on the surface

Surface divided into small patches $dS = du\,dv$ by a parameterization of the surface $[u(\mathbf{x}),v(\mathbf{x})]$

The flux through each patch is equal to the normal (perpendicular) component of the field $F_n(\mathbf{x}) = F(\mathbf{x})\cos \theta$ at the patch's location $\mathbf{x}$ multiplied by the area $dS$. The normal component is equal to the dot product of $\mathbf{F}(\mathbf{x})$ with the unit normal vector $\mathbf{n}(\mathbf{x})$ (blue arrows)

The total flux through the surface is found by adding up $\mathbf{F} \cdot \mathbf{n}\;dS$ for each patch. In the limit as the patches become infinitesimally small, this is the surface integral
$\iint_S \mathbf {F\cdot n}\;dS$

Consider a vector field v on a surface S, that is, for each r = (x, y, z) in S, v(r) is a vector.

The integral of v on S was defined in the previous section. Suppose now that it is desired to integrate only the normal component of the vector field over the surface, the result being a scalar, usually called the flux passing through the surface. For example, imagine that we have a fluid flowing through S, such that v(r) determines the velocity of the fluid at r. The flux is defined as the quantity of fluid flowing through S per unit time.

This illustration implies that if the vector field is tangent to S at each point, then the flux is zero because, on the surface S, the fluid just flows along S, and neither in nor out. This also implies that if v does not just flow along S, that is, if v has both a tangential and a normal component, then only the normal component contributes to the flux. Based on this reasoning, to find the flux, we need to take the dot product of v with the unit surface normal n to S at each point, which will give us a scalar field, and integrate the obtained field as above. In other words, we have to integrate v with respect to the vector surface element $\mathrm{d}\mathbf s = {\mathbf n} \mathrm{d}s$, which is the vector normal to S at the given point, whose magnitude is $\mathrm{d}s = \|\mathrm{d}{\mathbf s}\|.$

We find the formula

$$\begin{align}
\iint_S {\mathbf v}\cdot\mathrm d{\mathbf {s}} &= \iint_S \left({\mathbf v}\cdot {\mathbf n}\right)\,\mathrm ds\\
&{}= \iint_T \left({\mathbf v}(\mathbf{r}(s, t)) \cdot {\frac{\partial \mathbf{r}}{\partial s}\times \frac{\partial \mathbf{r}}{\partial t} \over \left\|\frac{\partial \mathbf{r}}{\partial s}\times \frac{\partial \mathbf{r}}{\partial t}\right\|}\right) \left\|\frac{\partial \mathbf{r}}{\partial s}\times \frac{\partial \mathbf{r}}{\partial t}\right\| \mathrm ds\, \mathrm dt\\
&{}=\iint_T {\mathbf v}(\mathbf{r}(s, t))\cdot \left(\frac{\partial \mathbf{r}}{\partial s}\times \frac{\partial \mathbf{r}}{\partial t}\right) \mathrm ds\, \mathrm dt.
\end{align}$$

The cross product on the right-hand side of the last expression is a (not necessarily unital) surface normal determined by the parametrisation.

This formula defines the integral on the left (note the dot and the vector notation for the surface element).

We may also interpret this as a special case of integrating 2-forms, where we identify the vector field with a 1-form, and then integrate its Hodge dual over the surface. This is equivalent to integrating $\left\langle \mathbf{v}, \mathbf{n} \right\rangle \mathrm dS$ over the immersed surface, where $\mathrm dS$ is the induced volume form on the surface, obtained by interior multiplication of the Riemannian metric of the ambient space with the outward normal of the surface.

== Surface integrals of differential 2-forms ==
Let

$$\omega=\omega_1 \mathrm dy \wedge \mathrm dz + \omega_2 \mathrm dz \wedge \mathrm dx + \omega_3 \mathrm dx \wedge \mathrm dy$$

be a differential 2-form defined on a surface S in $\mathbb{R}^3$, and let

$$\mathbf{r}: D \to \mathbb{R}^3$$

be an orientation preserving parametrization of S with $(s,t)$ in D. The coordinate 1-forms pull back as

$$\mathbf{r}^*(\mathrm dx)=\mathrm d(x \circ \mathbf{r})=\frac{\partial(x \circ \mathbf{r})}{\partial s}\mathrm ds+\frac{\partial(x \circ \mathbf{r})}{\partial t}\mathrm dt$$

So

$$\mathbf{r}^*(\mathrm dx \wedge \mathrm dy) = \frac{\partial(x \circ \mathbf{r},y \circ \mathbf{r})}{\partial(s,t)}  \mathrm ds \wedge \mathrm dt$$,

where the notation on the right denotes the Jacobian determinant. The pullbacks of the other forms are similar.

Then, the surface integral of $\omega$ on S is given by

$$\int_S \omega = \int_D \mathbf{r}^*(\omega)$$
$$=\int_D \left[ (\omega_1\circ\mathbf{r})\frac{\partial(y\circ\mathbf r,z\circ\mathbf r)}{\partial(s,t)} + (\omega_2\circ\mathbf{r})\frac{\partial(z\circ\mathbf r,x\circ\mathbf r)}{\partial(s,t)} + (\omega_3\circ\mathbf{r})\frac{\partial(x\circ\mathbf r,y\circ\mathbf r)}{\partial(s,t)}\right] \mathrm ds \wedge \mathrm dt$$

where

$${\partial \mathbf{r} \over \partial s}\times {\partial \mathbf{r} \over \partial t}=\left(\frac{\partial(y\circ\mathbf r,z\circ\mathbf r)}{\partial(s,t)}, \frac{\partial(z\circ\mathbf r,x\circ\mathbf r)}{\partial(s,t)}, \frac{\partial(x\circ\mathbf r,y\circ\mathbf r)}{\partial(s,t)}\right)$$

is the surface element normal to S.

Let us note that the integral of this 2-form is the same as the surface integral of the vector field which has as components $\omega_1$, $\omega_2$ and $\omega_3$.

== Theorems involving surface integrals ==
Various useful results for surface integrals can be derived using differential geometry and vector calculus, such as the divergence theorem, magnetic flux, and its generalization, Stokes' theorem.

== Dependence on parametrization ==
Let us notice that we defined the surface integral by using a parametrization of the surface S. We know that a given surface might have several parametrizations. For example, if we move the locations of the North Pole and the South Pole on a sphere, the latitude and longitude change for all the points on the sphere. A natural question is then whether the definition of the surface integral depends on the chosen parametrization. For integrals of scalar fields, the answer to this question is simple; the value of the surface integral will be the same no matter what parametrization one uses.

For integrals of vector fields, things are more complicated because the surface normal is involved. It can be proven that given two parametrizations of the same surface, whose surface normals point in the same direction, one obtains the same value for the surface integral with both parametrizations. If, however, the normals for these parametrizations point in opposite directions, the value of the surface integral obtained using one parametrization is the negative of the one obtained via the other parametrization. It follows that given a surface, we do not need to stick to any unique parametrization, but, when integrating vector fields, we do need to decide in advance in which direction the normal will point and then choose any parametrization consistent with that direction.

Another issue is that sometimes surfaces do not have parametrizations which cover the whole surface. The obvious solution is then to split that surface into several pieces, calculate the surface integral on each piece, and then add them all up. This is indeed how things work, but when integrating vector fields, one needs to again be careful how to choose the normal-pointing vector for each piece of the surface, so that when the pieces are put back together, the results are consistent. For the cylinder, this means that if we decide that for the side region the normal will point out of the body, then for the top and bottom circular parts, the normal must point out of the body too.

Last, there are surfaces which do not admit a surface normal at each point with consistent results (for example, the Möbius strip). If such a surface is split into pieces, on each piece a parametrization and corresponding surface normal is chosen, and the pieces are put back together, we will find that the normal vectors coming from different pieces cannot be reconciled. This means that at some junction between two pieces we will have normal vectors pointing in opposite directions. Such a surface is called non-orientable, and on this kind of surface, one cannot talk about integrating vector fields.

== See also ==
- Area element
- Cartesian coordinate system
- Divergence theorem
- Holstein–Herring method
- Line integral
- Line element
- Stokes' theorem
- Volume and surface area elements in cylindrical coordinate systems
- Volume and surface area elements in spherical coordinate systems
- Volume element
- Volume integral
