= Quasistatic approximation =

Equations that keep static form even if quantities vary in time

Quasistatic approximation(s) refers to different domains and different meanings. In the most common acceptance, quasistatic approximation refers to equations that keep a static form (do not involve time derivatives) even if some quantities are allowed to vary slowly with time. In electromagnetism it refers to mathematical models that can be used to describe devices that do not produce significant amounts of electromagnetic waves. For instance, the capacitor and the coil in electrical networks.

== Overview ==
The quasistatic approximation can be understood through the idea that the sources in the problem change sufficiently slowly that the system can be taken to be in equilibrium at all times. This approximation can then be applied to areas such as classical electromagnetism, fluid mechanics, magnetohydrodynamics, thermodynamics, and more generally systems described by hyperbolic partial differential equations involving both spatial and time derivatives. In simple cases, the quasistatic approximation is allowed when the typical spatial scale divided by the typical temporal scale is much smaller than the characteristic velocity with which information is propagated. The problem gets more complicated when several length and time scales are involved. In the strict acceptance of the term the quasistatic case corresponds to a situation where all time derivatives can be neglected. However, some equations can be considered as quasistatic while others are not, leading to a system still being dynamic. There is no general consensus in such cases.

== Fluid dynamics ==
In fluid dynamics, only quasi-hydrostatics (where no time derivative term is present) is considered as a quasi-static approximation. Flows are usually considered as dynamic as well as acoustic waves propagation.

== Thermodynamics ==
In thermodynamics, a distinction between quasistatic regimes and dynamic ones is usually made in terms of equilibrium thermodynamics versus non-equilibrium thermodynamics. As in electromagnetism some intermediate situations also exist; see for instance local equilibrium thermodynamics.

== Electromagnetism ==
In classical electromagnetism, there are at least two consistent quasistatic approximations of Maxwell equations: quasi-electrostatics and quasi-magnetostatics depending on the relative importance of the two dynamic coupling terms. These approximations can be obtained using time constants evaluations or can be shown to be Galilean limits of electromagnetism. For example, in applied geophysics (Sea Bed Logging), we can cite quasi-static approximation solvers for reducing computational simulation times and inversion calculation costs (software).

=== Retarded times point of view ===
In magnetostatics equations such as Ampère's law or the more general Biot–Savart law allow one to solve for the magnetic fields produced by steady electrical currents. Often, however, one may want to calculate the magnetic field due to time varying currents (accelerating charge) or other forms of moving charge. Strictly speaking, in these cases the aforementioned equations are invalid, as the field measured at the observer must incorporate distances measured at the retarded time, that is the observation time minus the time it took for the field (traveling at the speed of light) to reach the observer. Since the retarded time is different for every point to be considered, the resulting equations are quite complicated; often it is easier to formulate the problem in terms of potentials; see retarded potential and Jefimenko's equations.

In this point of view the quasistatic approximation is obtained by using time instead of retarded time or equivalently to assume that the speed of light is infinite. To first order, the mistake of using only Biot–Savart's law rather than both terms of Jefimenko's magnetic field equation fortuitously cancel.
