= Constant power circuit =

Constant current/voltage circuit work by measuring the voltage across and current drawn by the load. The curve representing the power limit for the load for the range of current and voltage magnitudes in which the load circuit may safely operate

1. Battery chargers are the largest single application for current controlled power supplies requiring either constant-current or constant-power output characteristics.
2. Motor drive applications can also require power supplies with controlled output current.
3. Super capacitor charger, These new capacitors, which provide impressive capacitance values such as 1F at 5 V in a mere cubic centimeter, can provide high power. The capacitor must first be charged, usually from a battery whose voltage is lower than the voltage on the charged capacitor. This must be done in a controlled manner.

== See also ==
- Switched-mode power supply
- Companies that manufacture DC-DC Converters:Vicor Corporation Lambda Electronics, Tyco International, Ltd., Artesyn Technologies, Power-One, Inc., Coil Technology Corporation
