= Biot–Savart law =

Law of classical electromagnetism

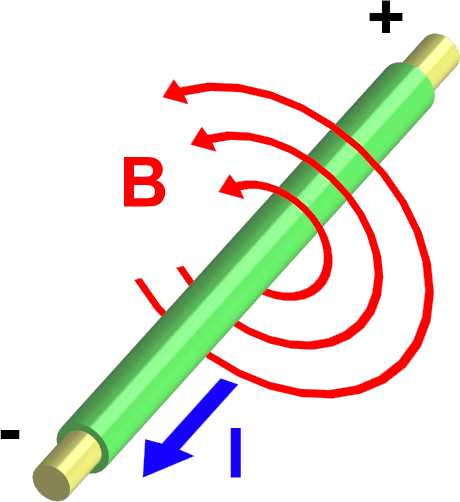
Magnetic field created by an electric current.

In physics, specifically electromagnetism, the Biot–Savart law (/ˈbiːoʊ səˈvɑːr/ or /ˈbjoʊ səˈvɑːr/) is an equation describing the magnetic field generated by a constant electric current. It relates the magnetic field to the magnitude, direction, length, and proximity of the electric current.

The Biot–Savart law is fundamental to magnetostatics. It is valid in the magnetostatic approximation and consistent with both Ampère's circuital law and Gauss's law for magnetism. When magnetostatics does not apply, the Biot–Savart law should be replaced by Jefimenko's equations. The law is named after Jean-Baptiste Biot and Félix Savart, who discovered this relationship in 1820.

== Equation ==
In the following equations, it is assumed that the medium is not magnetic (e.g., vacuum). This allows for straightforward derivation of magnetic field B, while the fundamental vector here is H.

=== Electric currents (along a closed curve/wire) ===
Shown are the directions of $I d\boldsymbol\ell$, $\mathbf{\hat r'}$, and the value of $|\mathbf{r'}|$

The Biot–Savart law is used for computing the resultant magnetic flux density B at position r in 3D-space generated by a filamentary current I (for example due to a wire). A steady (or stationary) current is a continual flow of charges which does not change with time and the charge neither accumulates nor depletes at any point. The law is a physical example of a line integral, being evaluated over the path C in which the electric currents flow (e.g. the wire). The equation in SI units teslas (T) is

$\mathbf{B}(\mathbf{r}) = \frac{\mu_0}{4\pi} \int_C \frac{I \, d\boldsymbol \ell\times\mathbf{r'}}{|\mathbf{r'}|^3}$

where $d\boldsymbol \ell$ is a vector along the path $C$ whose magnitude is the length of the differential element of the wire in the direction of conventional current, $\boldsymbol \ell$ is a point on path $C$, and $\mathbf{r'} = \mathbf{r} - \boldsymbol \ell$ is the full displacement vector from the wire element ($d\boldsymbol \ell$) at point $\boldsymbol \ell$ to the point at which the field is being computed ($\mathbf{r}$), and μ_{0} is the magnetic constant. Alternatively:
$$\mathbf{B}(\mathbf{r}) = \frac{\mu_0}{4\pi}\int_C \frac{I \, d\boldsymbol \ell\times\mathbf{\hat r'}}{|\mathbf{r'}|^2}$$
where $\mathbf{\hat r'}$ is the unit vector of $\mathbf{r'}$. The symbols in boldface denote vector quantities.

The integral is usually around a closed curve, since stationary electric currents can only flow around closed paths when they are bounded. However, the law also applies to infinitely long wires (this concept was used in the definition of the SI unit of electric current—the Ampere—until 20 May 2019).

To apply the equation, the point in space where the magnetic field is to be calculated is arbitrarily chosen ($\mathbf r$). Holding that point fixed, the line integral over the path of the electric current is calculated to find the total magnetic field at that point. The application of this law implicitly relies on the superposition principle for magnetic fields, i.e. the fact that the magnetic field is a vector sum of the field created by each infinitesimal section of the wire individually.

For example, consider the magnetic field of a loop of radius $R$ carrying a current $I.$ For a point at a distance $x$ along the center line of the loop, the magnetic field vector at that point is:
$$\mathbf B = {\mu_0IR^2\over 2(x^2+R^2)^{3/2}}\hat\mathbf x,$$
where $\hat{\mathbf x}$ is the unit vector of along the center-line of the loop (and the loop is taken to be centered at the origin). Loops such as the one described appear in devices like the Helmholtz coil, the solenoid, and the Magsail spacecraft propulsion system. Calculation of the magnetic field at points off the center line requires more complex mathematics involving elliptic integrals that require numerical solution or approximations.

=== Electric current density (throughout conductor volume) ===
The formulations given above work well when the current can be approximated as running through an infinitely-narrow wire. If the conductor has some thickness, the proper formulation of the Biot–Savart law (again in SI units) is:

$\mathbf B (\mathbf r) = \frac{\mu_0}{4\pi}\iiint_V\ \frac{(\mathbf{J}\,dV)\times\mathbf r'}{|\mathbf r'|^3}$

where $\mathbf{r'}$ is the vector from dV to the observation point $\mathbf{r}$, $dV$ is the volume element, and $\mathbf{J}$ is the current density vector in that volume (in SI in units of A/m^{2}).

In terms of unit vector $\mathbf{\hat r'}$
$$\mathbf B (\mathbf r) = \frac{\mu_0}{4\pi}\iiint_V\ dV \frac{\mathbf J\times\mathbf{\hat r'}}{|\mathbf r'|^2}$$

=== Constant uniform current ===
In the special case of a uniform constant current I, the magnetic field $\mathbf{B}$ is
$$\mathbf{B}(\mathbf{r}) = \frac{\mu_0}{4\pi} I \int_C \frac{d\boldsymbol \ell \times \mathbf{r'}}{|\mathbf{r'}|^3}$$
i.e., the current can be taken out of the integral.

=== Point charge at constant velocity ===
In the case of a point charged particle q moving at a constant velocity v, Maxwell's equations give the following expression for the electric field and magnetic field:
$$\begin{align}
\mathbf{E} &= \frac{q}{4\pi \varepsilon_0} \frac{1 - \beta^2}{\left(1 - \beta^2\sin^2\theta\right)^{3/2}} \frac{\mathbf{\hat r'}}{|\mathbf r'|^2} \\[1ex]
\mathbf{B} &= \frac{1}{c^2} \mathbf{v} \times \mathbf{E}
\end{align}$$
where

- $\mathbf \hat r'$ is the unit vector pointing from the current (non-retarded) position of the particle to the point at which the field is being measured,
- $\beta = v/c$ is the speed in units of $c$ and
- θ is the angle between $\mathbf v$ and $\mathbf r'$. Alternatively, these can be derived by considering Lorentz transformation of Coulomb's force (in four-force form) in the source charge's inertial frame.

When v^{2} ≪ c^{2}, the electric field and magnetic field can be approximated as
$$\mathbf{E} = \frac{q}{4\pi\varepsilon_0}\ \frac{\mathbf{\hat r'}}{|\mathbf r'|^2}$$
$$\mathbf{B} = {\mu_0\over 4\pi}q {\mathbf{v}\times\hat\mathbf r'\over|\mathbf r'|^2}$$

These equations were first derived by Oliver Heaviside in 1888. Some authors call the above equation for $\mathbf{B}$ the "Biot–Savart law for a point charge" due to its close resemblance to the standard Biot–Savart law. However, this language is misleading as the Biot–Savart law applies only to steady currents and a point charge moving in space does not constitute a steady current.

== Magnetic responses applications ==
The Biot–Savart law can be used in the calculation of magnetic responses even at the atomic or molecular level, e.g. chemical shieldings or magnetic susceptibilities, provided that the current density can be obtained from a quantum mechanical calculation or theory.

== Aerodynamics applications ==
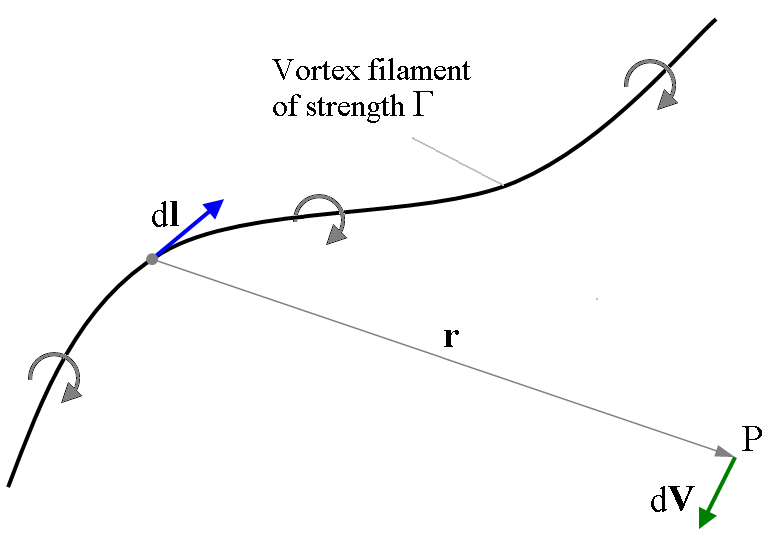
The figure shows the velocity ($dV$) induced at a point P by an element of vortex filament ($dl$) of strength $\Gamma$.

The Biot–Savart law is also used in aerodynamic theory to calculate the velocity induced by vortex lines.

In the aerodynamic application, the roles of vorticity and current are reversed in comparison to the magnetic application.

In Maxwell's 1861 paper 'On Physical Lines of Force', magnetic field strength H was directly equated with pure vorticity (spin), whereas B was a weighted vorticity that was weighted for the density of the vortex sea. Maxwell considered magnetic permeability μ to be a measure of the density of the vortex sea. Hence the relationship,

Magnetic induction current
$$\mathbf{B} = \mu \mathbf{H}$$
was essentially a rotational analogy to the linear electric current relationship,
Electric convection current
$$\mathbf{J} = \rho \mathbf{v} ,$$
where ρ is electric charge density.

B was seen as a kind of magnetic current of vortices aligned in their axial planes, with H being the circumferential velocity of the vortices.

The electric current equation can be viewed as a convective current of electric charge that involves linear motion. By analogy, the magnetic equation is an inductive current involving spin. There is no linear motion in the inductive current along the direction of the B vector. The magnetic inductive current represents lines of force. In particular, it represents lines of inverse square law force.

In aerodynamics the induced air currents form solenoidal rings around a vortex axis. Analogy can be made that the vortex axis is playing the role that electric current plays in magnetism. This puts the air currents of aerodynamics (fluid velocity field) into the equivalent role of the magnetic induction vector B in electromagnetism.

In electromagnetism the B lines form solenoidal rings around the source electric current, whereas in aerodynamics, the air currents (velocity) form solenoidal rings around the source vortex axis.

Hence in electromagnetism, the vortex plays the role of 'effect' whereas in aerodynamics, the vortex plays the role of 'cause'. Yet when we look at the B lines in isolation, we see exactly the aerodynamic scenario insomuch as B is the vortex axis and H is the circumferential velocity as in Maxwell's 1861 paper.

In two dimensions, for a vortex line of infinite length, the induced velocity at a point is given by
$$v = \frac{\Gamma}{2\pi r}$$
where Γ is the strength of the vortex and r is the perpendicular distance between the point and the vortex line. This is similar to the magnetic field produced on a plane by an infinitely long straight thin wire normal to the plane.

This is a limiting case of the formula for vortex segments of finite length (similar to a finite wire):
$$v = \frac{\Gamma}{4 \pi r} \left[\cos A - \cos B \right]$$
where A and B are the (signed) angles between the point and the two ends of the segment.

== The Biot–Savart law, Ampère's circuital law, and Gauss's law for magnetism ==
In a magnetostatic situation, the magnetic field B as calculated from the Biot–Savart law will always satisfy Gauss's law for magnetism and Ampère's circuital law:

Proof

Starting with the Biot–Savart law:
$$\mathbf B(\mathbf r) = \frac{\mu_0}{4\pi} \iiint_V d^3\boldsymbol{\ell} \, \mathbf J (\boldsymbol{\ell}) \times \frac{\mathbf r - \boldsymbol{\ell}}{|\mathbf r - \boldsymbol{\ell}|^3}$$

Substituting the relation
$$\frac{\mathbf r - \boldsymbol{\ell}}{|\mathbf r - \boldsymbol{\ell}|^3} = -\nabla\left(\frac{1}{|\mathbf r - \boldsymbol{\ell}|}\right)$$
and using the product rule for curls, as well as the fact that J does not depend on $\mathbf r$, this equation can be rewritten as
$$\mathbf B (\mathbf r) = \frac{\mu_0}{4\pi} \nabla\times\iiint_V d^3\boldsymbol{\ell} \, \frac{\mathbf J (\boldsymbol{\ell})}{|\mathbf r - \boldsymbol{\ell}|}$$

Since the divergence of a curl is always zero, this establishes Gauss's law for magnetism. Next, taking the curl of both sides, using the formula for the curl of a curl, and again using the fact that J does not depend on $\mathbf r$, we eventually get the result
$$\nabla\times\mathbf B = \frac{\mu_0}{4\pi} \nabla \iiint_V d^3\boldsymbol{\ell} \, \mathbf J (\boldsymbol{\ell})\cdot\nabla\left(\frac{1}{|\mathbf r - \boldsymbol{\ell}|}\right) - \frac{\mu_0}{4\pi} \iiint_V d^3\boldsymbol{\ell} \, \mathbf J (\boldsymbol{\ell})\nabla^2\left(\frac{1}{|\mathbf r - \boldsymbol{\ell}|}\right)$$

Finally, plugging in the relationships
$$\begin{align}
\nabla\left(\frac{1}{|\mathbf r - \boldsymbol{\ell}|}\right) &= -\nabla_{\boldsymbol{\ell}} \left(\frac{1}{|\mathbf r - \boldsymbol{\ell}|}\right), \\
\nabla^2\left(\frac{1}{|\mathbf r - \boldsymbol{\ell}|}\right) &= -4\pi \delta(\mathbf r - \boldsymbol{\ell})
\end{align}$$
(where δ is the Dirac delta function), using the fact that the divergence of J is zero (due to the assumption of magnetostatics), and performing an integration by parts, the result turns out to be
$$\nabla\times \mathbf B = \mu_0 \mathbf J$$
i.e. Ampère's circuital law. (Due to the assumption of magnetostatics, $\partial \mathbf E / \partial t = \mathbf 0$, so there is no extra displacement current term in Ampère's law.)

In a non-magnetostatic situation, the Biot–Savart law ceases to be true (it is superseded by Jefimenko's equations), while Gauss's law for magnetism and the Maxwell–Ampère law are still true.

== Theoretical background ==
Initially, the Biot–Savart law was discovered experimentally, in response to the work of Ampère. In its initial form, it looked very different, as modern vector calculus methods did not yet exist. Today, this law was derived in different ways theoretically from Maxwell's equations. In The Feynman Lectures on Physics, at first, the similarity of expressions for the electric potential outside the static distribution of charges and the magnetic vector potential outside the system of continuously distributed currents is emphasized, and then the magnetic field is calculated through the curl from the vector potential. Another approach involves a general solution of the inhomogeneous wave equation for the vector potential in the case of constant currents. The magnetic field can also be calculated as a consequence of the Lorentz transformations for the electromagnetic force acting from one charged particle on another particle. Two other ways of deriving the Biot–Savart law include: 1) Lorentz transformation of the electromagnetic tensor components from a moving frame of reference, where there is only an electric field of some distribution of charges, into a stationary frame of reference, in which these charges move. 2) the use of the method of retarded potentials.

== See also ==
=== People ===
- André-Marie Ampère
- James Clerk Maxwell
- Pierre-Simon Laplace

=== Electromagnetism ===
- Darwin Lagrangian
