= Jefimenko's equations =

Equations of electromagnetism

In electromagnetism, Jefimenko's equations (named after Oleg D. Jefimenko) describe the electric and magnetic fields generated by time-dependent distributions of electric charge and current. These equations account for the propagation delay of the fields due to the finite speed of light, and provide the general solution to Maxwell’s equations for any arbitrary distribution of sources. Jefimenko's equations are the time-dependent generalizations of Coulomb's law and the Biot–Savart law.

An alternative formulation for the electric field by Wolfgang Panofsky and Melba Phillips is known as the Panofsky–Phillips equation. This equation is related to Jefimenko's via the continuity equation for charge.

A version of Jefimenko's equations with a point-like electric charge as the source is known as the Heaviside–Feynman formula or Jefimenko–Feynman formula.

== Formulation ==
=== Electric and magnetic fields ===
Jefimenko's equations describe the electric field $\mathbf{E}$ and magnetic field $\mathbf B$ produced by an arbitrary, time-dependent distribution of charge density $\rho$ and current density $\mathbf{J}$:

$$\mathbf{E}
=
\frac{1}{4\pi\varepsilon_0}\,
\iiint
\left(
\frac{[\rho]\,\mathbf{n}}{r^2}
+
\frac{[\dot{\rho}]\,\mathbf{n}}{c\,r}
-
\frac{\left[\dot{\mathbf{J}}\right]}{c^2 r}
\right)
\, dV'$$

$$\mathbf{B}
=
\frac{1}{4\pi\varepsilon_0}\,
\displaystyle\iiint
\left(
\frac{\left[\mathbf{J}\right]\times\mathbf{n}}{c^2 r^2}
+
\frac{\left[\dot{\mathbf{J}}\right]\times\mathbf{n}}{c^3 r}
\right)
\, dV'$$

Here, $\varepsilon_0$ is the vacuum permittivity, $r = |\mathbf r-\mathbf r'|$ is the distance between the source point $\mathbf r'$ and the observation point $\mathbf r$, and $\mathbf{n}$ is the unit vector pointing from the source toward the observer.

Because electromagnetic disturbances propagate at the speed of light $c$, the fields observed at a point $\mathbf r$ at time $t$ are determined by the state of the sources at an earlier retarded time, $t_r = (t - r/c)$. The square brackets $[\ldots]$ indicate that the enclosed quantities are evaluated at retarded time:

$[\rho]=\rho\!\left(t-\displaystyle\frac{r}{c}\right)$ , $[\dot{\rho}]=\dot{\rho}\!\left(t-\displaystyle\frac{r}{c}\right)$, $[\mathbf{J}]=\mathbf{J}\!\left(t-\displaystyle\frac{r}{c}\right)$ and $\left[\dot{\mathbf{J}}\right]=\dot{\mathbf{J}}\!\left(t-\displaystyle\frac{r}{c}\right)$

In the electrostatic situation, the first term of the electric field equation reduces to the Coulomb's law. Similarly, in the magnetostatic limit, the first term of the magnetic field equation reduces to the Biot–Savart law. Jefimenko's equations are the time-dependent generalizations of these two laws.

=== Derivation from retarded potentials ===
Jefimenko's equations can be derived from the retarded potentials V and A:

$$V
=
\frac{1}{4\pi\varepsilon_0}\,
\displaystyle\iiint
\left(
\frac{[\rho]}{r}
\right)
\, dV'$$

$$\mathbf{A}
=
\frac{1}{4\pi\varepsilon_0 c^2}\,
\displaystyle\iiint
\left(
\frac{\left[\mathbf{J}\right]}{r}
\right)
\, dV'$$

These potentials are the solutions to Maxwell's equations in the potential formulation (see the Helmholtz theorem). To obtain the fields, these expressions are substituted into the definitions of the electromagnetic potentials :

$$\mathbf{E}
=
-\boldsymbol{\operatorname{grad}}\!\left(V\right)
-
\frac{\partial \mathbf{A}}{\partial t}$$

$$\mathbf{B}
=
\boldsymbol{\operatorname{rot}}\!\left(\mathbf{A}\right)$$

By performing the differentiations with respect to the observer's coordinates $\mathbf r$ and time $t$, the potentials are eliminated in favor of the direct functional dependence on the sources $\rho$ and $\mathbf J$. The fields have an implicit dependence on the position through $t_r$, which must be taken into account in the differentiation.

For the electric field, the detailed calculation gives:

$$-\boldsymbol{\operatorname{grad}}\!\left(V\right)
=
\frac{1}{4\pi\varepsilon_0}\,
\iiint
\left(
\frac{[\rho]\,\mathbf{n}}{r^2}
+
\frac{[\dot{\rho}]\,\mathbf{n}}{c\,r}
\right)
\, dV'$$
$$-
\frac{\partial \mathbf{A}}{\partial t}
=
-
\frac{1}{4\pi\varepsilon_0 c^2}\,
\iiint
\left(
\frac{\left[\dot{\mathbf{J}}\right]}{r}
\right)
\, dV'$$

== Panofsky–Phillips equation ==
The equation for the electric field can be written in an alternative form by using the continuity equation for electric charge:

$$\mathbf{E}
=
\frac{1}{4\pi\varepsilon_0}
\iiint
\left(
\frac{[\rho]\mathbf{n}}{r^2}
+
\frac{
\left([\mathbf{J}]\cdot\mathbf{n}\right)\mathbf{n}
+
\left([\mathbf{J}]\times\mathbf{n}\right)\times\mathbf{n}
}{c\,r^2}
+
\frac{
\left([\dot{\mathbf{J}}]\times\mathbf{n}\right)\times\mathbf{n}
}{c^2 r}
\right)
\, dV'$$

This equation was published in 1962 by Wolfgang Panofsky and Melba Phillips in the second edition of the textbook Classical Electricity and Magnetism and is sometimes known as the Panofsky–Phillips equation. Panofsky and Phillips also published in this textbook the same expression as Jefimenko for the magnetic field (equation 14-34).

The three terms in the equation represent different physical contributions to the electric field. The first term is related to the position of the source charges at the retarded time, and corresponds to Coulomb's law evaluated at the retarded time. The second term is related to the velocity of the source charges at the retarded time. It provides a correction to the retarded Coulomb field by compensating retardation effects when the currents are constant in time ($\dot{\mathbf{J}}=0$). This term vanishes in stationary regime when both $\nabla\cdot\mathbf{J}=0$ and $\dot{\mathbf{J}}=0$. The third term is produced by the acceleration of the source charges, and is referred to as the acceleration field or as the radiation field.

=== Distinction between near field and radiated field ===
The terms of the Panofsky–Phillips equations can be separated into two categories: The "near field" terms have a $1/r^2$ dependence, and are significant only in the immediate vicinity of the sources. The "far field" terms have a $1/r$ dependence. Due to their slower decrease with distance, they dominate as one moves away from the sources (see near field and far field).

$$\definecolor{vert}{RGB}{0,153,0}
\mathbf{E}
=
\frac{1}{4\pi\varepsilon_0}\,
\displaystyle\iiint
\left(
{\color{vert}
\frac{[\rho]\mathbf{n}}{r^2}
+
\frac{
\left(\left[\mathbf{J}\right]\cdot\mathbf{n}\right)\mathbf{n}
+
\left(\left[\mathbf{J}\right]\times\mathbf{n}\right)\times\mathbf{n}
}{c\,r^2}
}
\mathbin{\color{red}{+}}
{\color{red}
\frac{
\left(\left[\dot{\mathbf{J}}\right]\times\mathbf{n}\right)\times\mathbf{n}
}{c^2 r}
}
\right)
\, dV'$$

$$\definecolor{vert}{RGB}{0,153,0}
\mathbf{B}
=
\frac{1}{4\pi\varepsilon_0}\,
\displaystyle\iiint
\left(
{\color{vert}
\frac{\left[\mathbf{J}\right]\times\mathbf{n}}{c^2 r^2}
}
\mathbin{\color{red}{+}}
{\color{red}
\frac{\left[\dot{\mathbf{J}}\right]\times\mathbf{n}}{c^3 r}
}
\right)
\, dV'$$

- In green are the near fields (decaying as 1/r²).
- In red are the radiated fields (decaying as 1/r).

In the far-field region, near fields can be neglected and the expressions of the emitted fields reduce to:

Propagation of radiated fields in space

$$\mathbf{E}=\frac{1}{4\pi\varepsilon_0 c^2}\,\displaystyle\iiint\left(\frac{\left(\left[\dot{\mathbf{J}}\right]\times\mathbf{n}\right)\times\mathbf{n}}{r}\right)\, dV'$$
$$\mathbf{B}=\frac{1}{4\pi\varepsilon_0 c^3}\,\displaystyle\iiint\left(\frac{\left[\dot{\mathbf{J}}\right]\times\mathbf{n}}{r}\right)\, dV'$$

One therefore has $\mathbf{E}\perp\mathbf{B}\perp\mathbf{n}$ , with E and B related by:

$\mathbf{B} = \frac{\mathbf{n}\times\mathbf{E}}{c}$

The Panofsky–Phillips equation allows one to directly distinguish between near fields and radiated fields for the electric field—something that is not apparent in Jefimenko’s formulation. In Jefimenko's electric field equation, both the second and third terms appear to contribute to the far field because they scale with $1/r$. However, this is illusory; the longitudinal component of the third term cancels the $1/r$ dependence of the second term, leaving only the transverse components to propagate as radiation. Despite this complication, Jefimenko’s electric field equation is more compact and sometimes easier to use for calculations. One of the exceptions is the case of electric dipole radiation.

== Heaviside–Feynman formula ==
Explanation of the variables relevant for the Heaviside–Feynman formula.

The Heaviside–Feynman formula, also known as the Jefimenko–Feynman formula, can be seen as the point-like electric charge version of Jefimenko's equations. It can be non-trivially deduced from them using Dirac functions, or using the Liénard-Wiechert potentials. The formula provides a natural generalization of the Coulomb's law for cases where the source charge is moving:
$$\mathbf{E} =  \frac{-q}{4\pi \varepsilon_0} \left[ \frac{\mathbf{e}_{r'}}{r'^2} + \frac{r'}{c} \frac{d}{dt} \left(\frac{\mathbf{e}_{r'}}{r'^2}\right)  +\frac{1}{c^2} \frac{d^2}{dt^2} \mathbf{e}_{r'}  \right]$$
$$\mathbf{B} = - \mathbf{e}_{r'} \times \frac{\mathbf{E}}{c}$$
Here, $q$ is the electric charge, $\mathbf{e}_{r'}$ is a unit vector pointing from the observer to the charge and $r'$ is the distance between observer and charge. Both of these quantities are evaluated at the retarded time $t - r'/c$.

Illustration of the retarded charge position for a particle moving in one spatial dimension: the observer sees the particle where it was, not where it is.

The first term in the formula for $\mathbf{E}$ represents the Coulomb's law for the static electric field. The second term is the time derivative of the first Coulombic term multiplied by $r'/c$ which is the propagation time of the electric field. Heuristically, this can be regarded as nature "attempting" to forecast what the present field would be by linear extrapolation to the present time. The last term, proportional to the second derivative of the vector $e_{r'}$, is sensitive to charge motion perpendicular to the line of sight. It can be shown that the electric field generated by this term is proportional to $a_{t}/r'$, where $a_t$ is the transverse acceleration in the retarded time. As it decreases only as $1/r'$ with distance compared to the standard $1/r'^2$ Coulombic behavior, this term is responsible for the long-range electromagnetic radiation caused by the accelerating charge.

The Heaviside–Feynman formula allows, for example, the derivation of the Larmor formula for overall radiation power of the accelerating charge.

== Interpretations ==
Maxwell's equations are often interpreted as suggesting that spatially varying electric and magnetic fields induce one another, resulting in propagating electromagnetic waves. However, Oleg D. Jefimenko has argued that Maxwell's equations do not demonstrate a direct causal relationship between the fields as they are evaluated at the same instant in time.

Unlike in Maxwell equations, where both sides of the equality occur simultaneously, the fields on the left side of Jefimenko's equations are explicitly "caused" by the state of the sources at an earlier time. Under this interpretation, the electric and magnetic fields are not causing each other; instead, they are both effects of the same underlying cause: time-dependent electric charge and current distributions.

== History ==
According to Andrew Zangwill, the equations analogous to Jefimenko's but in the frequency domain were first derived by George Adolphus Schott in 1912. As pointed out by Kirk T. McDonald, The time-domain versions of the equations in the Panofsky–Phillips form appear first in 1962 in the second edition of Panofsky and Phillips's classic textbook. According to David J. Griffiths, Jefimenko's equations seem to have been first published by Oleg D. Jefimenko in 1966.

Heaviside–Feynman formula was published by Oliver Heaviside in 1904 and was rediscovered by Richard Feynman in 1963.

== See also ==
- Electric field
- Magnetic field
- Maxwell's equations
- Helmholtz theorem
- Retarded potential
- Electromagnetic radiation
- Near and far field
