= Coulomb's law =

Fundamental physical law of electromagnetism

The magnitude of the electrostatic force F between two point charges q_{1} and q_{2} is directly proportional to the product of the magnitudes of charges and inversely proportional to the square of the distance between them. Like charges repel each other, and unlike charges attract each other.

Coulomb's inverse-square law, or simply Coulomb's law, is a scientific law of physics that describes the amount of force between two electrically charged particles at rest. This electric force is conventionally called the electrostatic force or Coulomb force. Although the law was known earlier, it was first published in 1785 by French physicist Charles-Augustin de Coulomb. Coulomb's law was essential to the development of the theory of electromagnetism and may even be its starting point, as it allowed meaningful discussions of the amount of electric charge in a particle.

The law states that the magnitude, or absolute value, of the attractive or repulsive electrostatic force between two point charges is directly proportional to the product of the magnitudes of their charges and inversely proportional to the square of the distance between them. Coulomb discovered that bodies with like electrical charges repel:

It follows therefore from these three tests, that the repulsive force that the two balls – [that were] electrified with the same kind of electricity – exert on each other, follows the inverse proportion of the square of the distance.

Coulomb also showed that oppositely charged bodies attract according to an inverse-square law:
$$|F| \propto \frac{|q_1||q_2|}{r^2}$$

Here q_{1} and q_{2} are the quantities of each charge, and the scalar r is the distance between the charges. The proportionality constant depends upon the unit of charge used and may be called the Coulomb constant.

The force is along the straight line joining the two bodies. If the charges have the same sign, the electrostatic force between them makes them repel; if they have different signs, the force between them makes them attract.

Being an inverse-square law, the law is similar to Isaac Newton's inverse-square law of universal gravitation, but gravitational forces always make things attract, while electrostatic forces make charges attract or repel. Also, gravitational forces are much weaker than electrostatic forces. Coulomb's law can be used to derive Gauss's law, and vice versa. In the case of a single point charge at rest, the two laws are equivalent, expressing the same physical law in different ways. The law has been tested extensively, and observations have upheld the law on the scale from 10^{−16} m to 10^{8} m.

The time-dependent generalization of Coulomb's law is given by Jefimenko's equations, which describe the electric field and magnetic fields generated by time-dependent distributions of electric charge and current.

== History ==
Charles-Augustin de Coulomb

Ancient cultures around the Mediterranean knew that certain objects, such as rods of amber, could be rubbed with cat's fur to attract light objects like feathers and pieces of paper. Thales of Miletus made the first recorded description of static electricity around 600 BC, when he noticed that friction could make a piece of amber attract small objects.

In 1600, English scientist William Gilbert made a careful study of electricity and magnetism, distinguishing the lodestone effect from static electricity produced by rubbing amber. He coined the Neo-Latin word electricus ("of amber" or "like amber", from ἤλεκτρον [elektron], the Greek word for "amber") to refer to the property of attracting small objects after being rubbed. This association gave rise to the English words "electric" and "electricity", which made their first appearance in print in Thomas Browne's Pseudodoxia Epidemica of 1646.

Early investigators of the 18th century who suspected that the electrical force diminished with distance as the force of gravity did (i.e., as the inverse square of the distance) included Daniel Bernoulli and Alessandro Volta, both of whom measured the force between plates of a capacitor, and Franz Aepinus who supposed the inverse-square law in 1758.

Based on experiments with electrically charged spheres, Joseph Priestley of England was among the first to propose that electrical force followed an inverse-square law, similar to Newton's law of universal gravitation. However, he did not generalize or elaborate on this. In 1767, he conjectured that the force between charges varied as the inverse square of the distance.

Coulomb's torsion balance

In 1769, Scottish physicist John Robison announced that, according to his measurements, the force of repulsion between two spheres with charges of the same sign varied as x^{−2.06}.

In the early 1770s, the dependence of the force between charged bodies upon both distance and charge had already been discovered, but not published, by Henry Cavendish of England. In his notes, Cavendish wrote, "We may therefore conclude that the electric attraction and repulsion must be inversely as some power of the distance between that of the 2 + 1/50th and that of the 2 − 1/50th, and there is no reason to think that it differs at all from the inverse duplicate ratio".

Finally, in 1785, the French physicist Charles-Augustin de Coulomb published his application of a torsion balance to determine that the magnitude of the electric force between two point charges. He verified Priestley's earlier claim concerning like charges that the force is directly proportional to the product of the charges and inversely proportional to the square of the distance between them. Coulomb then showed the same law applied to the attraction of unlike charges.

The torsion balance consists of a bar suspended from its middle by a thin fiber. The fiber acts as a very weak torsion spring. In Coulomb's experiment, the torsion balance was an insulating rod with a metal-coated ball attached to one end, suspended by a silk thread. The ball was charged with a known charge of static electricity, and a second charged ball of the same polarity was brought near it. The two charged balls repelled one another, twisting the fiber through a certain angle, which could be read from a scale on the instrument. By knowing how much force it took to twist the fiber through a given angle, Coulomb was able to calculate the force between the balls and derive his inverse-square proportionality law.

== Mathematical form ==
In the image, the vector F_{1} is the force experienced by q_{1}, and the vector F_{2} is the force experienced by q_{2}. When q_{1}q_{2} > 0 the forces are repulsive (as in the image) and when q_{1}q_{2} < 0 the forces are attractive (opposite to the image). The magnitude of the forces will always be equal.

Coulomb's law states that the electrostatic force $\mathbf{F}_1$ experienced by a charge, $q_1$ at position $\mathbf{r}_1$, in the vicinity of another charge, $q_2$ at position $\mathbf{r}_2$, in a vacuum is equal to
$$\mathbf{F}_1 = \frac{q_1q_2}{4\pi\varepsilon_0} {\hat\mathbf r_{12}\over {|\mathbf r_{12}|}^2}$$

where MKS units are used and $\mathbf{r_{12} = r_1 - r_2}$ is the displacement vector between the charges, $\hat\mathbf r_{12}$ a unit vector pointing from $q_2$ to $q_1$, and $\varepsilon_0$ the electric constant. Here, $\mathbf{\hat{r}}_{12}$ is used for the vector notation. The electrostatic force $\mathbf{F}_2$ experienced by $q_2$, according to Newton's third law, is $\mathbf{F}_2=-\mathbf{F}_1$.

If both charges have the same sign (like charges) then the product $q_1q_2$ is positive and the direction of the force on $q_1$ is given by $\widehat{\mathbf{r}}_{12}$; the charges repel each other. If the charges have opposite signs then the product $q_1q_2$ is negative and the direction of the force on $q_1$ is $-\hat{\mathbf{r}}_{12}$; the charges attract each other.

=== System of discrete charges ===
The law of superposition allows Coulomb's law to be extended to include any number of point charges. The force acting on a point charge due to a system of point charges is simply the vector addition of the individual forces acting alone on that point charge due to each one of the charges. The resulting force vector is parallel to the electric field vector at that point, with that point charge removed.

Force $\mathbf{F}$ on a small charge $q$ at position $\mathbf{r}$, due to a system of $n$ discrete charges in vacuum is

$$\mathbf{F}(\mathbf{r}) = {q\over4\pi\varepsilon_0} \sum_{i=1}^n q_i {\hat\mathbf r_i\over {|\mathbf r_i|}^2} ,$$

where $q_i$ is the magnitude of the i th charge, $\mathbf{r}_i$ is the vector from its position to $\mathbf{r}$ and $\hat\mathbf r_i$ is the unit vector in the direction of $\mathbf r_i$.

=== Continuous charge distribution ===
In this case, the principle of linear superposition is also used. For a continuous charge distribution, an integral over the region containing the charge is equivalent to an infinite summation, treating each infinitesimal element of space as a point charge $dq$. The distribution of charge is usually linear, surface or volumetric.

For a linear charge distribution (a good approximation for charge in a wire) where $\lambda(\mathbf{r}')$ gives the charge per unit length at position $\mathbf{r}'$, and $d\ell'$ is an infinitesimal element of length,
$$dq' = \lambda(\mathbf{r'}) \, d\ell'.$$

For a surface charge distribution (a good approximation for charge on a plate in a parallel plate capacitor) where $\sigma(\mathbf{r}')$ gives the charge per unit area at position $\mathbf{r}'$, and $dA'$ is an infinitesimal element of area,
$$dq' = \sigma(\mathbf{r'})\,dA'.$$

For a volume charge distribution (such as charge within a bulk metal) where $\rho(\mathbf{r}')$ gives the charge per unit volume at position $\mathbf{r}'$, and $dV'$ is an infinitesimal element of volume,
$$dq' = \rho(\boldsymbol{r'})\,dV'.$$

The force on a small test charge $q$ at position $\boldsymbol{r}$ in vacuum is given by the integral over the distribution of charge
$$\mathbf{F}(\mathbf{r}) = \frac{q}{4\pi\varepsilon_0}\int dq' \frac{\mathbf{r} - \mathbf{r'}}{|\mathbf{r} - \mathbf{r'}|^3}.$$

The "continuous charge" version of Coulomb's law is never supposed to be applied to locations for which $|\mathbf{r} - \mathbf{r'}| = 0$ because that location would directly overlap with the location of a charged particle (e.g. electron or proton) which is not a valid location to analyze the electric field or potential classically. Charge is always discrete in reality, and the "continuous charge" assumption is just an approximation that is not supposed to allow $|\mathbf{r} - \mathbf{r'}| = 0$ to be analyzed.

== Coulomb constant ==
The constant of proportionality $k_e$ in Coulomb's law depends upon the unit of charge used. In Gaussian and Heaviside–Lorentz units the unit of charge is determined by choosing a value for the Coulomb constant and using the force between charges to define the unit of charge. The constant $k_e$ is chosen to be 1 in Gaussian units and 1/4$\pi$ in Heaviside-Lorentz units.

In the SI units (which grew out of the MKS units and MKSA units), the unit of charge, the Coulomb, has been defined since the SI units were revised in 2019 as a multiple of the fundamental charge (i.e. the charge on the electron or proton).. Accordingly, the Coulomb constant is something that has to be determined through measurement. The value of the proportionality factor $k_e$is not listed by standards organization such as NIST, but the value of $\mu_0/4\pi$ is listed, as is the value of $\varepsilon_0$. From the first of these one can use the identity $c^2 = 1/\varepsilon_0\mu_0$ to write the Coulomb constant as
$$k_e = \frac{1}{4\pi\varepsilon_0} = \frac{\mu_0 c^2}{4\pi} = (0.999 999 999 87(16) \times 10^{-7} \mathrm{ N \cdot A^{-2} }) c^2$$
Since 1983 the meter has been defined so that the speed of light $c$ has an exact value, namely 299,792,458 m/s. Using that value and one ampere as one coulomb per second gives:
$$k_e = 8.9875517862(14)\times 10^9\mathrm{N\cdot m^2\cdot C^{-2}}$$
Because the value of $c$ is very close to $3 \times 10^8$ m/s, the value of $k_e$ is very close to $9\times 10^9\ \mathrm{N{\cdot}m^2{\cdot}C^{-2}}$. Some textbooks (after warning the reader) use 3 as an abbreviation for 2.99792458 (see e.g. Jackson) and 9 for 8.9875517862 (e.g. Feynman).

Prior to the 2019 revision, the Ampere was defined by setting $\mu_0$ to the exact value $4 \pi \times 10^{-7}$N A$^{-2}$.. Accordingly, in the SI units as defined between 1984 and 2018,
$$k_e = \frac{1}{4\pi\varepsilon_0} = \frac{\mu_0 c^2}{4\pi} = (10^{-7} \mathrm{ N \cdot A^{-2} }) c^2 = 8.9875517873681764 \times 10^9 \mathrm{N\cdot m^2\cdot C^{-2}}$$
exactly. Prior to 1983, the definition of $\varepsilon_0$ meant that $k_e = 1/4\pi\varepsilon_0 = 10^{-7}c^2$ held, but the speed of light was a measured value, not a defined exact constant.

== Limitations ==
There are three conditions to be fulfilled for the validity of Coulomb's inverse square law:

1. The charges must have a spherically symmetric distribution (e.g. be point charges, or a charged metal sphere).
2. The charges must not overlap (e.g. they must be distinct point charges).
3. The charges must be stationary with respect to a non-accelerating frame of reference.

The last of these is known as the electrostatic approximation. When movement takes place, an extra factor is introduced, which alters the force produced on the two objects. This extra part of the force is called the magnetic force. For slow movement, the magnetic force is minimal and Coulomb's law can still be considered approximately correct. A more accurate approximation in this case is, however, the Weber force. When the charges are moving more quickly in relation to each other or accelerations occur, Maxwell's equations and Einstein's theory of relativity must be taken into consideration.

== Electric field ==
If two charges have the same sign, the electrostatic force between them is repulsive; if they have different sign, the force between them is attractive.

An electric field is a vector field that associates to each point in space the Coulomb force experienced by a unit test charge. The strength and direction of the Coulomb force $\mathbf F$ on a charge $q_t$ depends on the electric field $\mathbf{E}$ established by other charges that it finds itself in, such that $\mathbf{F} = q_t \mathbf{E}$. In the simplest case, the field is considered to be generated solely by a single source point charge. More generally, the field can be generated by a distribution of charges who contribute to the overall by the principle of superposition.

If the field is generated by a positive source point charge $q$, the direction of the electric field points along lines directed radially outwards from it, i.e. in the direction that a positive point test charge $q_t$ would move if placed in the field. For a negative point source charge, the direction is radially inwards.

The magnitude of the electric field E can be derived from Coulomb's law. By choosing one of the point charges to be the source, and the other to be the test charge, it follows from Coulomb's law that the magnitude of the electric field E created by a single source point charge Q at a certain distance from it r in vacuum is given by
$$|\mathbf{E}| = k_\text{e} \frac{|Q|}{r^2}$$

A system of n discrete charges $q_i$ stationed at $\mathbf r_i = \mathbf r-\mathbf r_i$ produces an electric field whose magnitude and direction is, by superposition
$$\mathbf{E}(\mathbf{r}) = {1\over4\pi\varepsilon_0} \sum_{i=1}^n q_i {\hat\mathbf r_i\over {|\mathbf r_i|}^2}$$

== Atomic forces ==
Coulomb's law holds even within atoms, correctly describing the force between the positively charged atomic nucleus and each of the negatively charged electrons. This simple law also correctly accounts for the forces that bind atoms together to form molecules and for the forces that bind atoms and molecules together to form solids and liquids. Generally, as the distance between ions increases, the force of attraction, and binding energy, approach zero and ionic bonding is less favorable. As the magnitude of opposing charges increases, energy increases and ionic bonding is more favorable.

== Relation to Gauss's law ==
=== Deriving Gauss's law from Coulomb's law ===
Strictly speaking, Gauss's law cannot be derived from Coulomb's law alone, since Coulomb's law gives the electric field due to an individual, electrostatic point charge only. However, Gauss's law can be proven from Coulomb's law if it is assumed, in addition, that the electric field obeys the superposition principle. The superposition principle states that the resulting field is the vector sum of fields generated by each particle (or the integral, if the charges are distributed smoothly in space).

Outline of proof

Coulomb's law states that the electric field due to a stationary point charge is:
$$\mathbf{E}(\mathbf{r}) = \frac{q}{4\pi \varepsilon_0} \frac{\mathbf{e}_r}{r^2}$$
where

- e_{r} is the radial unit vector,
- r is the radius, |r|,
- ε_{0} is the electric constant,
- q is the charge of the particle, which is assumed to be located at the origin.

Using the expression from Coulomb's law, we get the total field at r by using an integral to sum the field at r due to the infinitesimal charge at each other point s in space, to give
$$\mathbf{E}(\mathbf{r}) = \frac{1}{4\pi\varepsilon_0} \int \frac{\rho(\mathbf{s})(\mathbf{r}-\mathbf{s})}{|\mathbf{r}-\mathbf{s}|^3} \, \mathrm{d}^3 \mathbf{s}$$
where ρ is the charge density. If we take the divergence of both sides of this equation with respect to r, and use the known theorem

$$\nabla \cdot \left(\frac{\mathbf{r}}{|\mathbf{r}|^3}\right) = 4\pi \delta(\mathbf{r})$$
where δ(r) is the Dirac delta function, the result is
$$\nabla\cdot\mathbf{E}(\mathbf{r}) = \frac{1}{\varepsilon_0} \int \rho(\mathbf{s})\, \delta(\mathbf{r}-\mathbf{s})\, \mathrm{d}^3 \mathbf{s}$$

Using the "sifting property" of the Dirac delta function, we arrive at
$$\nabla\cdot\mathbf{E}(\mathbf{r}) = \frac{\rho(\mathbf{r})}{\varepsilon_0},$$
which is the differential form of Gauss's law, as desired.

Since Coulomb's law only applies to stationary charges, there is no reason to expect Gauss's law to hold for moving charges based on this derivation alone. In fact, Gauss's law does hold for moving charges, and, in this respect, Gauss's law is more general than Coulomb's law.

Proof (without Dirac Delta)

Let $\Omega \subseteq R^3$ be a bounded open set, and
$$\mathbf E_0(\mathbf r) = \frac {1}{4 \pi \varepsilon_0} \int_{\Omega} \rho(\mathbf r')\frac {\mathbf r - \mathbf r'} {\left | \mathbf r - \mathbf r' \right |^3}d^3 r'
\equiv \frac {1}{4 \pi \varepsilon_0} \int_{\Omega} e(\mathbf{r, \mathbf{r}'})d^3 r'$$
be the electric field, with $\rho(\mathbf r')$ a continuous function (density of charge).

It is true for all $\mathbf{r} \neq \mathbf{r'}$ that $\nabla_\mathbf{r} \cdot \mathbf{e}(\mathbf{r, r'}) = 0$.

Consider now a compact set $V \subseteq R^3$ having a piecewise smooth boundary $\partial V$ such that $\Omega \cap V = \emptyset$. It follows that $e(\mathbf{r, \mathbf{r}'}) \in C^1(V \times \Omega)$ and so, for the divergence theorem:

$$\oint_{\partial V} \mathbf{E}_0 \cdot d\mathbf{S} = \int_V \mathbf{\nabla} \cdot \mathbf{E}_0 \, dV$$

But because $e(\mathbf{r, \mathbf{r}'}) \in C^1(V \times \Omega)$,

$$\mathbf{\nabla} \cdot \mathbf{E}_0(\mathbf{r}) = \frac {1}{4 \pi \varepsilon_0} \int_{\Omega} \nabla_\mathbf{r} \cdot e(\mathbf{r, \mathbf{r}'}){\mathrm{d}\mathbf{r}'} = 0$$
for the argument above ($\Omega \cap V = \emptyset \implies \forall \mathbf{r} \in V \ \ \forall \mathbf{r'} \in \Omega \ \ \ \mathbf{r} \neq \mathbf{r'}$ and then $\nabla_\mathbf{r} \cdot \mathbf{e}(\mathbf{r, r'}) = 0$)

Therefore the flux through a closed surface generated by some charge density outside (the surface) is null.

Now consider $\mathbf{r}_0 \in \Omega$, and $B_R(\mathbf{r}_0)\subseteq \Omega$ as the sphere centered in $\mathbf{r}_0$ having $R$ as radius (it exists because $\Omega$ is an open set).

Let $\mathbf{E}_{B_R}$ and $\mathbf{E}_C$ be the electric field created inside and outside the sphere respectively. Then,

$\mathbf{E}_{B_R} = \frac {1}{4 \pi \varepsilon_0} \int_{B_R(\mathbf{r}_0)} e(\mathbf{r, \mathbf{r}'}){\mathrm{d}\mathbf{r}'}$, $\mathbf{E}_C = \frac {1}{4 \pi \varepsilon_0} \int_{\Omega \setminus B_R(\mathbf{r}_0)} e(\mathbf{r, \mathbf{r}'}){\mathrm{d}\mathbf{r}'}$ and $\mathbf{E}_{B_R} + \mathbf{E}_C = \mathbf{E}_0$

$$\Phi(R) =
\oint_{\partial B_R(\mathbf{r}_0)} \mathbf{E}_0 \cdot d\mathbf{S} =
\oint_{\partial B_R(\mathbf{r}_0)} \mathbf{E}_{B_R} \cdot d\mathbf{S} +
\oint_{\partial B_R(\mathbf{r}_0)} \mathbf{E}_C \cdot d\mathbf{S} =
\oint_{\partial B_R(\mathbf{r}_0)} \mathbf{E}_{B_R} \cdot d\mathbf{S}$$

The last equality follows by observing that $(\Omega \setminus B_R(\mathbf{r}_0)) \cap B_R(\mathbf{r}_0) = \emptyset$, and the argument above.

The RHS is the electric flux generated by a charged sphere, and so:

$$\Phi(R) =\frac {Q(R)}{\varepsilon_0}  = \frac {1}{\varepsilon_0} \int_{B_R(\mathbf{r}_0)} \rho(\mathbf r'){\mathrm{d}\mathbf{r}'} =
\frac {1}{\varepsilon_0} \rho(\mathbf r'_c)|B_R(\mathbf{r}_0)|$$
with $r'_c \in \ B_R(\mathbf{r}_0)$

Where the last equality follows by the mean value theorem for integrals. Using the squeeze theorem and the continuity of $\rho$, one arrives at:

$$\mathbf{\nabla} \cdot \mathbf{E}_0(\mathbf{r}_0) =
\lim_{R \to 0} \frac{1}{|B_R(\mathbf{r}_0)|}\Phi(R) =
\frac {1}{\varepsilon_0} \rho(\mathbf r_0)$$

=== Deriving Coulomb's law from Gauss's law ===
Strictly speaking, Coulomb's law cannot be derived from Gauss's law alone, since Gauss's law does not give any information regarding the curl of E (see Helmholtz decomposition and Faraday's law). However, Coulomb's law can be proven from Gauss's law if it is assumed, in addition, that the electric field from a point charge is spherically symmetric (this assumption, like Coulomb's law itself, is exactly true if the charge is stationary, and approximately true if the charge is in motion).

Outline of proof

Taking S in the integral form of Gauss's law to be a spherical surface of radius r, centered at the point charge Q, we have
$$\oint_S\mathbf{E}\cdot d\mathbf{A} = \frac{Q}{\varepsilon_0}$$

By the assumption of spherical symmetry, the integrand is a constant which can be taken out of the integral. The result is
$$4\pi r^2\hat{\mathbf{r}}\cdot\mathbf{E}(\mathbf{r}) = \frac{Q}{\varepsilon_0}$$
where r̂ is a unit vector pointing radially away from the charge. Again by spherical symmetry, E points in the radial direction, and so we get
$$\mathbf{E}(\mathbf{r}) = \frac{Q}{4\pi \varepsilon_0} \frac{\hat{\mathbf{r}}}{r^2}$$
which is essentially equivalent to Coulomb's law. Thus the inverse-square law dependence of the electric field in Coulomb's law follows from Gauss's law.

== In relativity ==
Coulomb's law can be used to gain insight into the form of the magnetic field generated by moving charges since by special relativity, in certain cases the magnetic field can be shown to be a transformation of forces caused by the electric field. When no acceleration is involved in a particle's history, Coulomb's law can be assumed on any test particle in its own inertial frame, supported by symmetry arguments in solving Maxwell's equation, shown above. Coulomb's law can be expanded to moving test particles to be of the same form. This assumption is supported by Lorentz force law which, unlike Coulomb's law is not limited to stationary test charges. Considering the charge to be invariant of observer, the electric and magnetic fields of a uniformly moving point charge can hence be derived by the Lorentz transformation of the four force on the test charge in the charge's frame of reference given by Coulomb's law and attributing magnetic and electric fields by their definitions given by the form of Lorentz force. The fields hence found for uniformly moving point charges are given by:
$$\mathbf{E} = \frac q {4 \pi \varepsilon_0 r^3}   \frac {1- \beta^2} {(1- \beta^2 \sin^2 \theta)^{3/2}} \mathbf{r}$$
$$\mathbf{B} = \frac q {4 \pi \varepsilon_0 r^3}   \frac {1- \beta^2} {(1- \beta^2 \sin^2 \theta)^{3/2}} \frac{\mathbf{v} \times \mathbf{r}}{c^2} = \frac{\mathbf{v} \times \mathbf{E}}{c^2}$$
where $q$ is the charge of the point source, $\mathbf{r}$ is the position vector from the point source to the point in space, $\mathbf{v}$ is the velocity vector of the charged particle, $\beta$ is the ratio of speed of the charged particle divided by the speed of light and $\theta$ is the angle between $\mathbf{r}$ and $\mathbf{v}$.

This form of solutions need not obey Newton's third law as is the case in the framework of special relativity (yet without violating relativistic-energy momentum conservation). Note that the expression for electric field reduces to Coulomb's law for non-relativistic speeds of the point charge and that the magnetic field in non-relativistic limit (approximating $\beta\ll 1$) can be applied to electric currents to get the Biot–Savart law. These solutions, when expressed in retarded time also correspond to the general solution of Maxwell's equations given by solutions of Liénard–Wiechert potential, due to the validity of Coulomb's law within its specific range of application. Also note that the spherical symmetry for gauss law on stationary charges is not valid for moving charges owing to the breaking of symmetry by the specification of direction of velocity in the problem. Agreement with Maxwell's equations can also be manually verified for the above two equations.

== Coulomb potential ==
=== Quantum field theory ===
The most basic Feynman diagram for QED interaction between two fermions

The Coulomb potential admits continuum states (with E > 0), describing electron-proton scattering, as well as discrete bound states, representing the hydrogen atom. It can also be derived within the non-relativistic limit between two charged particles, as follows:

Under Born approximation, in non-relativistic quantum mechanics, the scattering amplitude $\mathcal{A}(| \mathbf{p} \rangle \to | \mathbf{p}'\rangle)$ is:
$$\mathcal{A}(| \mathbf{p} \rangle \to | \mathbf{p}'\rangle) - 1 = 2\pi \delta(E_p - E_{p'})(-i)\int d^3\mathbf r \, V(\mathbf r) e^{-i(\mathbf p - \mathbf p')\mathbf r}$$
This is to be compared to the:
$$\int \frac{d^3k}{(2\pi)^3} e^{i k r_0} \langle p',k |S| p,k \rangle$$
where we look at the (connected) S-matrix entry for two electrons scattering off each other, treating one with "fixed" momentum as the source of the potential, and the other scattering off that potential.

Using the Feynman rules to compute the S-matrix element, we obtain in the non-relativistic limit with $m_0 \gg | \mathbf p|$
$$\langle p',k | S | p,k \rangle |_{conn} = -i\frac{e^2}{| \mathbf p - \mathbf p'|^2 - i\varepsilon}(2m)^2\delta(E_{p,k} - E_{p',k})(2\pi)^4\delta(\mathbf p - \mathbf p')$$

Comparing with the QM scattering, we have to discard the $(2m)^2$ as they arise due to differing normalizations of momentum eigenstate in QFT compared to QM and obtain:
$$\int V(\mathbf r)e^{-i(\mathbf p - \mathbf p') \mathbf r}d^3\mathbf r = \frac{e^2}{| \mathbf p - \mathbf p'|^2 - i\varepsilon}$$
where Fourier transforming both sides, solving the integral and taking $\varepsilon \to 0$ at the end will yield
$$V(r) = \frac{e^2}{4\pi r}$$
as the Coulomb potential.

However, the equivalent results of the classical Born derivations for the Coulomb problem are thought to be strictly accidental.

The Coulomb potential, and its derivation, can be seen as a special case of the Yukawa potential, which is the case where the exchanged boson – the photon – has no rest mass.

== Verification ==
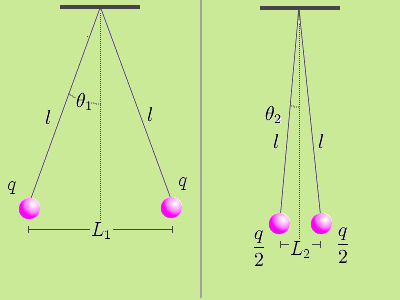
Experiment to verify Coulomb's law.

It is possible to verify Coulomb's law with a simple experiment. Consider two small spheres of mass $m$ and same-sign charge $q$, hanging from two ropes of negligible mass of length $l$. The forces acting on each sphere are three: the weight $mg$, the rope tension $\mathbf T$ and the electric force $\mathbf F$. In the equilibrium state:

$$\mathbf T \sin \theta_1 =\mathbf F_1$$	1

and

$$\mathbf T \cos \theta_1 = mg$$	2

Dividing (1) by (2):

$$\frac {\sin \theta_1}{\cos \theta_1 }=\frac {F_1}{mg}\Rightarrow F_1= mg \tan \theta_1$$	3

Let $\mathbf L_1$ be the distance between the charged spheres; the repulsion force between them $\mathbf F_1$, assuming Coulomb's law is correct, is equal to

$$F_1 = \frac{q^2}{4 \pi \varepsilon_0 L_1^2}$$	Coulomb's law

so:

$$\frac{q^2}{4 \pi \varepsilon_0 L_1^2}=mg \tan \theta_1$$	4

If we now discharge one of the spheres, and we put it in contact with the charged sphere, each one of them acquires a charge $\frac{q}{2}$. In the equilibrium state, the distance between the charges will be $\mathbf L_2 < \mathbf L_1$ and the repulsion force between them will be:

$$F_2 = \frac{{(\frac{q}{2})}^2}{4 \pi \varepsilon_0 L_2^2}=\frac{\frac{q^2}{4}}{4 \pi \varepsilon_0 L_2^2}$$	5

We know that $\mathbf F_2 = mg \tan \theta_2$ and:
$$\frac{\frac{q^2}{4}}{4 \pi \varepsilon_0 L_2^2}=mg \tan \theta_2$$
Dividing (4) by (5), we get:

$$\frac{\left(\cfrac{q^2}{4 \pi \varepsilon_0 L_1^2} \right)}{\left(\cfrac{\frac{q^2}{4}}{4 \pi \varepsilon_0 L_2^2}\right)} = \frac{mg \tan \theta_1}{mg \tan \theta_2} \Rightarrow 4 {\left( \frac {L_2}{L_1} \right) }^2 = \frac{ \tan \theta_1}{ \tan \theta_2}$$	6

Measuring the angles $\theta_1$ and $\theta_2$ and the distance between the charges $\mathbf L_1$ and $\mathbf L_2$ is sufficient to verify that the equality is true taking into account the experimental error. In practice, angles can be difficult to measure, so if the length of the ropes is sufficiently great, the angles will be small enough to make the following approximation:

$$\tan \theta \approx \sin \theta = \frac{\frac{L}{2}}{\ell} = \frac{L}{2\ell} \Rightarrow \frac{ \tan \theta_1}{ \tan \theta_2} \approx \frac{\frac{L_1}{2\ell}}{\frac{L_2}{2\ell}}$$	7

Using this approximation, the relationship (6) becomes the much simpler expression:

$$\frac{\frac{L_1}{2\ell}}{\frac{L_2}{2\ell}}\approx 4 {\left ( \frac {L_2}{L_1} \right ) }^2 \Rightarrow \frac{L_1}{L_2}\approx 4 {\left ( \frac {L_2}{L_1} \right ) }^2 \Rightarrow \frac{L_1}{L_2}\approx\sqrt[3]{4}$$	8

In this way, the verification is limited to measuring the distance between the charges and checking that the division approximates the theoretical value.

== See also ==
- Biot–Savart law
- Darwin Lagrangian
- Electromagnetic force
- Gauss's law
- Jefimenko's equations
- Method of image charges
- Molecular modelling
- Newton's law of universal gravitation, which uses a similar structure, but for mass instead of charge
- Static forces and virtual-particle exchange
- Casimir effect

== Related reading ==
- Coulomb, Charles Augustin (1788) [1785]. "Premier mémoire sur l'électricité et le magnétisme". Histoire de l'Académie Royale des Sciences. Imprimerie Royale. pp. 569–577.
- Coulomb, Charles Augustin (1788) [1785]. "Second mémoire sur l'électricité et le magnétisme". Histoire de l'Académie Royale des Sciences. Imprimerie Royale. pp. 578–611.
- Coulomb, Charles Augustin (1788) [1785]. "Troisième mémoire sur l'électricité et le magnétisme". Histoire de l'Académie Royale des Sciences. Imprimerie Royale. pp. 612–638.
- Griffiths, David J. (1999). Introduction to Electrodynamics (3rd ed.). Prentice Hall. ISBN 978-0-13-805326-0.
- Tamm, Igor E. (1979) [1976]. Fundamentals of the Theory of Electricity (9th ed.). Moscow: Mir. pp. 23–27.
- Spavieri, G; Gillies, G T; Rodriguez, M (October 2004). "Physical implications of Coulomb's Law". Metrologia. 41 (5): S159–S170. doi:10.1088/0026-1394/41/5/S06. ISSN 0026-1394.
- Tipler, Paul A.; Mosca, Gene (2008). Physics for Scientists and Engineers (6th ed.). New York: W. H. Freeman and Company. ISBN 978-0-7167-8964-2. LCCN 2007010418.
- Young, Hugh D.; Freedman, Roger A. (2010). Sears and Zemansky's University Physics: With Modern Physics (13th ed.). Addison-Wesley (Pearson). ISBN 978-0-321-69686-1.
