= Retarded potential =

Type of potential in electrodynamics

In electrodynamics, the retarded potentials are the electromagnetic potentials for the electromagnetic field generated by time-varying electric current or charge distributions in the past. The fields propagate at the speed of light c, so the delay of the fields connecting cause and effect at earlier and later times is an important factor: the signal takes a finite time to propagate from a point in the charge or current distribution (the point of cause) to another point in space (where the effect is measured), see figure below.

== In the Lorenz gauge ==
Position vectors r and r′ used in the calculation

The starting point is Maxwell's equations in the potential formulation using the Lorenz gauge:

$$\Box \varphi = \dfrac{\rho}{\epsilon_0} \,,\quad \Box \mathbf{A} = \mu_0\mathbf{J}$$

where φ(r, t) is the electric potential and A(r, t) is the magnetic vector potential, for an arbitrary source of charge density ρ(r, t) and current density J(r, t), and $\Box$ is the D'Alembert operator. Solving these gives the retarded potentials below (all in SI units).

=== For time-dependent fields ===
For time-dependent fields, the retarded potentials are:

$$\mathrm\varphi (\mathbf r , t) = \frac{1}{4\pi\epsilon_0}\int \frac{\rho (\mathbf r' ,  t_r)}{|\mathbf r - \mathbf r'|}\, \mathrm{d}^3\mathbf r'$$

$$\mathbf A (\mathbf r , t) = \frac{\mu_0}{4\pi}\int \frac{\mathbf J (\mathbf r' ,  t_r)}{|\mathbf r - \mathbf r'|}\, \mathrm{d}^3\mathbf r'\,.$$

where r is a point in space, t is time,

$$t_r = t-\frac{|\mathbf r - \mathbf r'|}{c}$$

is the retarded time, and d^{3}r' is the integration measure using r'.

From φ(r, t) and A(r, t), the fields E(r, t) and B(r, t) can be calculated using the definitions of the potentials:

$$-\mathbf{E} = \nabla\varphi +\frac{\partial\mathbf{A}}{\partial t}\,,\quad \mathbf{B}=\nabla\times\mathbf A\,.$$

and this leads to Jefimenko's equations. The corresponding advanced potentials have an identical form, except the advanced time

$$t_a = t+\frac{|\mathbf r - \mathbf r'|}{c}$$

replaces the retarded time.

=== In comparison with static potentials for time-independent fields ===
In the case the fields are time-independent (electrostatic and magnetostatic fields), the time derivatives in the $\Box$ operators of the fields are zero, and Maxwell's equations reduce to

$$\nabla^2 \varphi =-\dfrac{\rho}{\epsilon_0}\,,\quad \nabla^2 \mathbf{A} =- \mu_0 \mathbf{J}\,,$$

where ∇^{2} is the Laplacian, which take the form of Poisson's equation in four components (one for φ and three for A), and the solutions are:

$$\mathrm\varphi (\mathbf{r}) = \frac{1}{4\pi\epsilon_0}\int \frac{\rho (\mathbf r' )}{|\mathbf r - \mathbf r'|}\, \mathrm{d}^3\mathbf r'$$

$$\mathbf A (\mathbf{r}) = \frac{\mu_0}{4\pi}\int \frac{\mathbf J (\mathbf r' )}{|\mathbf r - \mathbf r'|}\, \mathrm{d}^3\mathbf r'\,.$$

These also follow directly from the retarded potentials.

== In the Coulomb gauge ==
In the Coulomb gauge, Maxwell's equations are

$$\nabla^2 \varphi =-\dfrac{\rho}{\epsilon_0}$$

$$\nabla^2 \mathbf{A} - \dfrac{1}{c^2}\dfrac{\partial^2 \mathbf{A}}{\partial t^2}=- \mu_0 \mathbf{J} +\dfrac{1}{c^2}\nabla\left(\dfrac{\partial \varphi}{\partial t}\right)\,,$$

although the solutions contrast the above, since A is a retarded potential yet φ changes instantly, given by:

$$\varphi(\mathbf{r}, t) = \dfrac{1}{4\pi\epsilon_0}\int \dfrac{\rho(\mathbf{r}',t)}{|\mathbf r - \mathbf r'|}\mathrm{d}^3\mathbf{r}'$$

$$\mathbf{A}(\mathbf{r},t) = \dfrac{1}{4\pi \varepsilon_0} \nabla\times\int \mathrm{d}^3\mathbf{r'} \int_0^{|\mathbf{r}-\mathbf{r}'|/c} \mathrm{d}t_r \dfrac{ t_r \mathbf{J}(\mathbf{r'}, t-t_r)}{|\mathbf{r}-\mathbf{r}'|^3}\times (\mathbf{r}-\mathbf{r}') \,.$$

This presents an advantage and a disadvantage of the Coulomb gauge - φ is easily calculable from the charge distribution ρ but A is not so easily calculable from the current distribution j. However, provided we require that the potentials vanish at infinity, they can be expressed neatly in terms of fields:

$$\varphi(\mathbf{r}, t) = \dfrac{1}{4\pi}\int \dfrac{\nabla \cdot \mathbf{E}(\mathbf{r}',t)}{|\mathbf r - \mathbf r'|}\mathrm{d}^3\mathbf{r}'$$

$$\mathbf{A}(\mathbf{r},t) = \dfrac{1}{4\pi}\int \dfrac{\nabla \times \mathbf{B}(\mathbf{r}',t)}{|\mathbf r - \mathbf r'|}\mathrm{d}^3\mathbf{r}'$$

== In linearized gravity ==
The retarded potential in linearized general relativity is closely analogous to the electromagnetic case. The trace-reversed tensor $\tilde h_{\mu\nu} = h_{\mu\nu} - \frac 1 2 \eta_{\mu\nu} h$ plays the role of the four-vector potential, the harmonic gauge $\tilde h^{\mu\nu}{}_{,\mu} = 0$ replaces the electromagnetic Lorenz gauge, the field equations are $\Box \tilde h_{\mu\nu} = -16\pi G T_{\mu\nu}$, and the retarded-wave solution is
$$\tilde h_{\mu\nu}(\mathbf r, t) = 4 G \int \frac{T_{\mu\nu}(\mathbf r', t_r)}{|\mathbf r - \mathbf r'|} \mathrm d^3 \mathbf r'.$$
Using SI units, the expression must be divided by $c^4$, as can be confirmed by dimensional analysis.

== Occurrence and application ==
A many-body theory which includes an average of retarded and advanced Liénard–Wiechert potentials is the Wheeler–Feynman absorber theory also known as the Wheeler–Feynman time-symmetric theory.

In gravitation, there are application examples for calculating deviations in orbits of satellites, moons or planets. The anomalies in the rotation curves of more than one hundred spiral galaxies of different types could also be explained. The data of the “SPARC (Spitzer Photometry and Accurate Rotation Curves) Galaxy collection”, which were recorded with the Spitzer Space Telescope, were used for this purpose. In this way, neither the assumption of dark matter nor a modification of general relativity is required to explain the observations.

In 2026 the German physicist Andreas Malcherek published about a new theory of gravitoelectromagnetism that builds on the basic work of Oliver Heaviside und Oleg D. Jefimenko. The new theory applies retarded gravitational potentials within Minkowski spacetime and is consistent with all the predictions of Albert Einstein's general theory of relativity, without taking into account the equivalence principle or for curved space.

== Example ==
The potential of charge with uniform speed on a straight line has inversion in a point that is in the recent position. The potential is not changed in the direction of movement.

== See also ==
- Maxwell's equations
- Liénard–Wiechert potential
- Panofsky–Phillips equations
- Jefimenko's equations
- Lenz's law
- Whitehead's theory of gravitation
