= Oleg D. Jefimenko =

American physicist (1922–2009)

Oleg Jefimenko
- Born: October 14, 1922; Kharkiv, Ukrainian SSR
- Died: May 14, 2009 (aged 86); Morgantown, United States
- Known for: Jefimenko's equations

Academic background
- Education: Lewis and Clark College (B.A. 1952); University of Oregon (M.Sc. 1954, Ph.D. 1956)

Academic work
- Discipline: Physics
- Sub-discipline: Electromagnetism; Gravitation
- Institutions: West Virginia University

Oleg Dmitrovich Jefimenko (October 14, 1922, Kharkiv, Ukrainian SSR – May 14, 2009, Morgantown, West Virginia, United States) (Note: Ukrainian: Олег Дмитрович Єфименко, romanized: Oleh Dmytrovych Yefymenko; Russian: Олег Дмитриевич Ефименко) was a physicist and professor emeritus at West Virginia University, best known for his work on the Jefimenko's equations.

== Biography ==
Jefimenko received his bachelor's degree at Lewis and Clark College in 1952 and his master's degree at the University of Oregon in 1954. He received his Ph.D. at the University of Oregon in 1956. Jefimenko worked for the development of the theory of electromagnetic retardation and relativity. In 1956, he was awarded the Sigma Xi Prize. In 1971 and 1973, he won awards in the AAPT Apparatus Competition. Jefimenko constructed and operated electrostatic generators run by atmospheric electricity.

Jefimenko worked on the generalization of Newton's gravitational theory to time-dependent systems. In his opinion, there is no objective reason for abandoning Newton's force-field gravitational theory (in favor of a metric gravitational theory). He was trying to develop and expand Newton's theory, making it compatible with the principle of causality and making it applicable to time-dependent gravitational interactions.

Jefimenko's expansion, or generalization, is based on the existence of the second gravitational force field, the "cogravitational, or Heaviside's field". This might also be called a gravimagnetic field. It represents a physical approach profoundly different from the time-space geometry approach of Einstein's general theory of relativity. Oliver Heaviside first predicted this field in the article A Gravitational and Electromagnetic Analogy (1893).

== Electromagnetic analogy of gravitational and cogravitational fields ==
Jefimenko suggests that electromagnetic equations can be converted to their gravitational-cogravitational equivalent by replacing electromagnetic symbols and constants with their corresponding gravitational-cogravitational symbols and constants, given in the table below.

Corresponding symbols and constants
Electric	Gravitational
q (charge)	m (mass)
ρ (volume charge density)	ρ (volume mass density)
σ (surface charge density)	σ (surface mass density)
λ (line charge density)	λ (line mass density)
φ (scalar potential)	φ (scalar potential)
A (vector potential)	A (vector potential)
J (convection current density)	J (mass-current density)
I (electric current)	I (mass current)
m (magnetic dipole moment)	d (cogravitational moment)
E (electric field)	g (gravitational field)
B (magnetic field)	K (cogravitational field)
ε_{0} (permittivity of space)	$-\tfrac{1}{4\pi G}$
μ_{0} (permeability of space)	$-\tfrac{4\pi G}{c^2}$
$-\tfrac{1}{4\pi\varepsilon_0}$ or $-\tfrac{\mu_0 c^2}{4\pi}$	G (gravitational constant)

== Generalized theory of gravitation ==
Jefimenko posits the following generalized theory of gravitation.

$$\begin{align}
& \mathbf{g} = -G \int \left[\dfrac{[\rho]}{r^3} + \dfrac{1}{r^2c}\left[\dfrac{\partial \rho}{\partial t}\right]\right]\mathbf(r)dV' + \dfrac{G}{c^2} \int\dfrac{1}{r}\left[\dfrac{\partial(\rho\mathbf{v})}{\partial t}\right]dV',\\
& \mathbf{K} = -\dfrac{G}{c^2} \int \left[\dfrac{[\rho\mathbf{v}]}{r^3} + \dfrac{1}{r^2c}\dfrac{\partial[\rho\mathbf{v}]}{\partial t}\right] \times \mathbf{r}dV',
\end{align}$$

== Selected publications ==
=== Books ===
- Jefimenko, Oleg (2006), Gravitation and Cogravitation: Developing Newton's Theory of Gravitation to its Physical and Mathematical Conclusion, Star City: Electret Scientific Company, ISBN 0-917406-15-X
- Electromagnetic Retardation and Theory of Relativity: New Chapters in the Classical Theory of Fields, 2nd ed., Electret Scientific, Star City, 2004.
- Causality, Electromagnetic Induction, and Gravitation: A Different Approach to the Theory of Electromagnetic and Gravitational Fields, 2nd ed., Electret Scientific, Star City, 2000.
- Electricity and Magnetism: An Introduction to the Theory of Electric and Magnetic Fields, 2nd ed., Electret Scientific, Star City, 1989.
- Scientific Graphics with Lotus 1-2-3: Curve Plotting, 3D Graphics, and Pictorial Compositions. Electret Scientific, Star City, 1987.
- 30 Music Programs for Timex Sinclair 2068. Electret Scientific, Star City, 1985.
- Electrostatic motors; their history, types, and principles of operation. Star City [W. Va.], Electret Scientific Co. [1973]. LCCN 73180890
- Electrostatic motors; their history, types, and principles of operation; NEW REVISED EDITION, edited by Thomas Valone. Integrity Research Institute, Beltsville, MD [2011].

== See also ==
- Electret
- Electrostatic generator
