= Retarded time =

Propagation delay of EM radiation (light)

In electromagnetism, an electromagnetic wave (light) in vacuum travels at a finite speed (the speed of light c). The retarded time is a wave emission time, which is a wave observation time subtracted by the wave propagation delay between the emission and the observation, since it takes time for information to travel between an emitter and an observer. This arises due to causality.

== Retarded and advanced times ==
Position vectors r and r′ used in the calculation

Retarded time t_{r} or t′ is calculated with a "speed-distance-time" calculation for EM (Electro-Magnetic) fields.

If the EM field is radiated at position vector r′ (within the source charge distribution), and an observer at position r measures the EM field at time t, the time delay for the field to travel from the charge distribution to the observer is |r − r′|/c. Subtracting this delay from the observer's time t then gives the time when the field began to propagate, i.e. the retarded time t′.

The retarded time is: $t' = t - \frac{|\mathbf{r}-(\mathbf{r}') |}{c}$

(which can be rearranged to $c = |\mathbf{r}-\mathbf{r}'| / (t - t')$, showing how the positions and times of source and observer are causally linked).

A related concept is the advanced time t_{a}, which takes the same mathematical form as above, but with a “+” instead of a “−”:

$$t_a = t + \frac{|\mathbf r - \mathbf r'|}{ c}$$

This is the time when the EM field originating at $\left( \mathbf{r},t\right)$ reaches a position $\mathbf{r}'$by traveling over a distance $|\mathbf{r}-\mathbf{r}'|$. Corresponding to retarded and advanced times are retarded and advanced potentials.

== Retarded position ==
The retarded position r' (the position where an EM wave emitted at the retarded time t') can be obtained from the current position of a particle by subtracting the distance it has travelled in the lapse from the retarded time to the current time. For an inertial particle, this position can be obtained by solving this equation:

$$\mathbf{r}-\mathbf{r'} = \mathbf{r}-\left( \mathbf{r_c}-\frac{|\mathbf{r}-\mathbf{r'}|}{c}\mathbf{v} \right) = \mathbf{r}-\mathbf{r_c}+\frac{|\mathbf{r}-\mathbf{r'}|}{c}\mathbf{v}$$,

where r_{c} is the current position of the source charge distribution and v its velocity.

== Application ==
A moving source emit a signal at periodic intervals. As the signal propagates at a finite speed, a detector will only see the signal after a retarded time has passed.

Perhaps surprisingly - electromagnetic fields and forces acting on charges depend on their history, not their mutual separation. The calculation of the electromagnetic fields at a present time includes integrals of charge density ρ(r', t_{r}) and current density J(r', t_{r}) using the retarded times and source positions. The quantity is prominent in electrodynamics, electromagnetic radiation theory, and in Wheeler–Feynman absorber theory, since the history of the charge distribution affects the fields at later times.

== See also ==
- Antenna measurement
- Electromagnetic four-potential
- Jefimenko's equations
- Liénard–Wiechert potential
- Light-time correction
