= Constant current =

Direct current that does not change intensity with time

A constant current (steady current, time-independent current, stationary current) is a type of direct current (DC) that does not change its intensity with time. The syntagma stationary current is a contradiction in terms, however in use.

== Sources ==
If the load is constant, a steady current can be obtained via a constant voltage source. If the load is varying, a steady current can be obtained via a constant current supply source.

=== Constant voltage sources ===
An electrochemical cell is a device capable of either generating electrical energy from chemical reactions or facilitating chemical reactions through the introduction of electrical energy. A common example of an electrochemical cell is a standard 1.5-volt cell meant for consumer use. This type of device is known as a single Galvanic cell, so an obsolete name for steady current was galvanic current. A battery consists of two or more cells, connected in either parallel or series pattern.

A homopolar generator is an electrical generator comprising an electrically conductive disc or cylinder rotating in a plane perpendicular to a uniform static magnetic field. A magnetohydrodynamic generator directly extracts electric power from moving hot gases through a magnetic field, without the use of rotating electromagnetic machinery.

AC generators can be used as sources of steady current with a rectifier and a good ripple filter. Pulsed DC generators can be used as sources of steady current with a good ripple filter.

=== Constant current power supplies ===
In electronics, a constant current system is one that varies the voltage across a load to maintain a constant electric current. When a component is indicated to be driven by a constant current, the driver circuit is, in essence, a current regulator and must appear to the component as a current source of suitable reliability.

An important usage of constant current power supplies is with LEDs. While a high series resistance is sufficient to light an LED, sometimes the design needs to guard against high current (or risk burning out the LEDs).

Another use is in fluorescent lamps which have very dynamic electrical resistance and are optimally operated within a short range of currents. Other uses include shielded metal arc welding and gas tungsten arc welding.

==== Constant Current Source Applications for LEDs ====
- Reliability Testing
- Device Burn-in Test
- HASS and IESNA LM-80 Applications
- Energy Star Certification
- Calibration Lamp Drive
- DC Driven Lamps
- Resistor Aging
- Laser Diode DC Drive

== See also ==
- Current source
- LED circuit
