= Electromagnetic stress–energy tensor =

In relativistic physics, the electromagnetic stress–energy tensor is the contribution to the stress–energy tensor due to the electromagnetic field. The stress–energy tensor describes the flow of energy and momentum in spacetime. The electromagnetic stress–energy tensor contains the negative of the classical Maxwell stress tensor that governs the electromagnetic interactions.

It was introduced by Hermann Minkowski in 1907.

== Definition ==
=== ISQ convention ===
The electromagnetic stress–energy tensor in the International System of Quantities (ISQ), which underlies the SI, is
$$T^{\mu\nu} = \frac{1}{\mu_0} \left[ F^{\mu \alpha}F^\nu{}_{\alpha} - \frac{1}{4} \eta^{\mu\nu}F_{\alpha\beta} F^{\alpha\beta}\right] \,,$$
where $F^{\mu\nu}$ is the electromagnetic tensor and where $\eta_{\mu\nu}$ is the Minkowski metric tensor of metric signature (− + + +) and the Einstein summation convention over repeated indices is used.

Explicitly in matrix form:
$$T^{\mu\nu} = \begin{bmatrix}
u & \frac{1}{c}S_\text{x} & \frac{1}{c}S_\text{y} & \frac{1}{c}S_\text{z} \\
\frac{1}{c}S_\text{x} & -\sigma_\text{xx} & -\sigma_\text{xy} & -\sigma_\text{xz} \\
\frac{1}{c}S_\text{y} & -\sigma_\text{yx} & -\sigma_\text{yy} & -\sigma_\text{yz} \\
\frac{1}{c}S_\text{z} & -\sigma_\text{zx} & -\sigma_\text{zy} & -\sigma_\text{zz}
\end{bmatrix},$$
where
$$u = \frac{1}{2}\left(\epsilon_0 \mathbf{E}^2+\frac{1}{\mu_0}\mathbf{B}^2\right)$$
is the volumetric energy density,
$$\mathbf{S} = \frac{1}{\mu_0}\mathbf{E}\times\mathbf{B}$$
is the Poynting vector,
$$\sigma_{ij} = \epsilon_0 E_i E_j + \frac{1}{{\mu _0}}B_i B_j - \frac{1}{2} \left( \epsilon_0 \mathbf{E}^2 + \frac{1}{\mu _0}\mathbf{B}^2 \right)\delta _{ij}$$
is the Maxwell stress tensor, and $c$ is the speed of light. Thus, each component of $T^{\mu\nu}$ is dimensionally equivalent to pressure (with SI unit pascal).

=== Gaussian CGS conventions ===
The constants in the Gaussian system (shown here with a prime) that correspond to the permittivity of free space and permeability of free space are
$$\epsilon_0' = \frac{1}{4\pi},\quad \mu_0' = 4\pi$$
then:
$$T^{\mu\nu} = \frac{1}{4\pi} \left[F'^{\mu\alpha}F'^{\nu}{}_{\alpha} - \frac{1}{4} \eta^{\mu\nu}F'_{\alpha\beta}F'^{\alpha\beta}\right]$$
and in explicit matrix form:
$$T^{\mu\nu} = \begin{bmatrix}
u & \frac{1}{c}S_\text{x} & \frac{1}{c}S_\text{y} & \frac{1}{c}S_\text{z} \\
\frac{1}{c}S_\text{x} & -\sigma_\text{xx} & -\sigma_\text{xy} & -\sigma_\text{xz} \\
\frac{1}{c}S_\text{y} & -\sigma_\text{yx} & -\sigma_\text{yy} & -\sigma_\text{yz} \\
\frac{1}{c}S_\text{z} & -\sigma_\text{zx} & -\sigma_\text{zy} & -\sigma_\text{zz}
\end{bmatrix}$$
where the energy density becomes
$$u = \frac{1}{8\pi}\left(\mathbf{E}'^2 + \mathbf{B}'^2\right)$$
and the Poynting vector becomes
$$\mathbf{S} = \frac{c}{4\pi}\mathbf{E}'\times\mathbf{B}'.$$

The stress–energy tensor for an electromagnetic field in a dielectric medium is less well understood and is the subject of the Abraham–Minkowski controversy.

The element $T^{\mu\nu}$ of the stress–energy tensor represents the flux of the component with index $\mu$ of the four-momentum of the electromagnetic field, $P^{\mu}$, going through a hyperplane. It represents the contribution of electromagnetism to the source of the gravitational field (curvature of spacetime) in general relativity.

== Algebraic properties ==
The electromagnetic stress–energy tensor has several algebraic properties:

- It is a symmetric tensor:
  $$T^{\mu\nu} = T^{\nu\mu}$$
- The tensor $T^{\nu}{}_{\alpha}$ is traceless (in 4D):
  $$T^{\alpha}{}_{\alpha} = 0.$$
  Proof
  Starting with
  $$T^{\mu}{}_{\mu} = \eta_{\mu\nu}T^{\mu\nu}$$
  Using the explicit form of the tensor,
  $$T^{\mu}{}_{\mu} = \frac{1}{\mu_0}\left[\eta_{\mu\nu}F^{\mu\alpha}F^{\nu}{}_{\alpha} - \eta_{\mu\nu}\eta^{\mu\nu}\frac{1}{4}F^{\alpha\beta}F_{\alpha\beta}\right]$$
  Lowering the indices and using the fact that $\eta^{\mu\nu}\eta_{\mu\nu} = \delta^{\mu}_{\mu}$,
  $$T^{\mu}{}_{\mu} = \frac{1}{\mu_0} \left[F^{\mu\alpha} F_{\mu\alpha} - \delta^{\mu}_{\mu} \frac{1}{4} F^{\alpha\beta} F_{\alpha\beta}\right]$$
  Then, using $\delta^{\mu}_{\mu} = 4$,
  $$T^{\mu}{}_{\mu} = \frac{1}{\mu_0}\left[F^{\mu\alpha} F_{\mu\alpha} - F^{\alpha\beta} F_{\alpha\beta}\right]$$
  Note that in the first term, $\mu$ and $\alpha$ are dummy indices, so we relabel them as $\alpha$ and $\beta$ respectively.
  $$T^{\alpha}{}_{\alpha} = \frac{1}{\mu_0}\left[F^{\alpha\beta} F_{\alpha\beta} - F^{\alpha\beta} F_{\alpha\beta}\right] = 0$$
- The energy density is positive-definite:
  $$T^{00} \ge 0$$

The symmetry of the tensor is as for a general stress–energy tensor in general relativity. The trace of the energy–momentum tensor is a Lorentz scalar; the electromagnetic field (and in particular electromagnetic waves) has no Lorentz-invariant energy scale, so its energy–momentum tensor must have a vanishing trace. This tracelessness eventually relates to the masslessness of the photon.

== Conservation laws ==
The electromagnetic stress–energy tensor allows a compact way of writing the conservation laws of linear momentum and energy in electromagnetism. The divergence of the stress–energy tensor is:
$$\partial_\nu T^{\mu \nu} + \eta^{\mu \rho} \, f_\rho = 0 \,$$
where $f_\rho$ is the (4D) Lorentz force per unit volume on matter.

This equation is equivalent to the following 3D conservation laws
$$\begin{align}
\frac{\partial u_\mathrm{em}}{\partial t} + \mathbf{\nabla} \cdot \mathbf{S} + \mathbf{J} \cdot \mathbf{E} &= 0 \\
\frac{\partial \mathbf{p}_\mathrm{em}}{\partial t} - \mathbf{\nabla}\cdot \sigma + \rho \mathbf{E} + \mathbf{J} \times \mathbf{B} &= 0
\ \Leftrightarrow\ \epsilon_0 \mu_0 \frac{\partial \mathbf{S}}{\partial t} - \nabla \cdot \mathbf{\sigma} + \mathbf{f} = 0
\end{align}$$
respectively describing the electromagnetic energy density
$$u_\mathrm{em} = \frac{1}{2} \left( \epsilon_0\mathbf{E}^2 + \frac{1}{\mu_0}\mathbf{B}^2 \right)$$
and electromagnetic momentum density
$$\mathbf{p}_\mathrm{em} = {\mathbf{S} \over {c^2}} ,$$
where $\mathbf{J}$ is the electric current density, $\rho$ the electric charge density, and $\mathbf{f}$ is the Lorentz force density.

== See also ==
- Bel–Robinson tensor
- Covariant formulation of classical electromagnetism
- Einstein field equations
- General relativity
- Magnetohydrodynamics
- Mathematical descriptions of the electromagnetic field
- Maxwell's equations
- Maxwell's equations in curved spacetime
- Ricci calculus
- Vector calculus
