= Bel–Robinson tensor =

Superenergy tensor of gravitational field flux-energy in a vacuum

In general relativity and differential geometry, the Bel–Robinson tensor is a tensor defined in the abstract index notation by:

$$T_{abcd}=C_{aecf}C_{b} {}^{e} {}_{d} {}^{f} + \frac{1}{4}\epsilon_{ae}{}^{hi} \epsilon_{b}{}^{ej}{}_{k} C_{hicf} C_{j}{}^{k}{}_{d}{}^{f}$$

Alternatively,

$$T_{abcd} = C_{aecf}C_{b} {}^{e} {}_{d} {}^{f} - \frac{3}{2} g_{a[b} C_{jk]cf} C^{jk}{}_{d}{}^{f}$$

where $C_{abcd}$ is the Weyl tensor. It was introduced by Lluís Bel in 1959. The Bel–Robinson tensor is constructed from the Weyl tensor in a manner analogous to the way the electromagnetic stress–energy tensor is built from the electromagnetic tensor. Like the electromagnetic stress–energy tensor, the Bel–Robinson tensor is totally symmetric and traceless:

$$\begin{align}
T_{abcd} &= T_{(abcd)} \\
T^{a}{}_{acd} &= 0
\end{align}$$

In general relativity, there is no unique definition of the local energy of the gravitational field. The Bel–Robinson tensor is a possible definition for local energy, since it can be shown that whenever the Ricci tensor vanishes (i.e. in vacuum), the Bel–Robinson tensor is divergence-free:

$$\nabla^{a} T_{abcd} = 0$$

== See also ==
- Bel decomposition
- Lanczos tensor
