= Maxwell stress tensor =

Electromagnetic stress

In classical electromagnetism, the Maxwell stress tensor (named after James Clerk Maxwell) is the stress tensor of an electromagnetic field. In tensor index notation it is given by:
$$\sigma_{ij} =
\varepsilon_0 E_i E_j + \frac{1}{\mu_0}B_i B_j - \left(\frac{\varepsilon_0}{2} E^2 + \frac{B^2}{2\mu_0}\right) \delta_{ij} ,$$
where $\varepsilon_0$ is the electric constant, $\mu_0$ the magnetic constant, E the electric field, B the magnetic field, and $\delta_{ij}$ is the Kronecker delta. In the Gaussian system, it is given by:
$$\sigma_{ij} = \frac{1}{4\pi} \left[E_i E_j + H_i H_j - \frac{1}{2} \left(E^2 + H^2\right) \delta_{ij}\right],$$
where H is the magnetizing field. ($E^2$ etc is the field magnitude squared, though this is slightly non-standard in tensor notation.)

The elements $ij$ have units of force per unit of area (negative pressure), denoting the force parallel to the $i$th axis suffered by a surface normal to the $j$th axis per unit of area. As such the diagonal elements give the tension acting on the plane normal to the corresponding axis and the off-diagonal elements represent shear stress in the plane.

Expressed in vector/dyad notation we would have:
$$\boldsymbol{\sigma} = \varepsilon_0 \mathbf{E} \otimes \mathbf{E} +  \frac{1}{\mu_0}\mathbf{B} \otimes \mathbf{B} - \left(\frac{\varepsilon_0}{2} E^2  + \frac{1}{2\mu_0}B^2 \right)\mathbb{I}$$
in SI units or
$$\boldsymbol{\sigma} = \frac{1}{4\pi} \left[ \mathbf{E} \otimes \mathbf{E} + \mathbf{H} \otimes \mathbf{H} - \frac{1}{2} \left(E^2 + H^2\right) \mathbb{I} \right]$$
in CGS units where $\otimes$ is the dyadic product, and the last tensor is the unit dyadic:
$$\mathbb{I} \equiv \begin{pmatrix}
1 & 0 & 0 \\
0 & 1 & 0 \\
0 & 0 & 1
\end{pmatrix} =
\mathbf{\hat x} \otimes \mathbf{\hat x} + \mathbf{\hat y} \otimes \mathbf{\hat y} + \mathbf{\hat z} \otimes \mathbf{\hat z}$$

In the relativistic formulation of electromagnetism, the nine components of the Maxwell stress tensor appear, negated, as components of the electromagnetic stress–energy tensor, which is the electromagnetic component of the total stress–energy tensor. The latter describes the density and flux of energy and momentum in spacetime.

The following derivation defines the Maxwell stress tensor by way of introducing it so as to show how electromagnetic body forces arise from electrical and magnetic fields. For an explanation more directly as to how the tensor describes stress (in the absence of body forces) see the web article by J.S.Reid.

== Derivation ==
As outlined below, the electromagnetic force is written in terms of $\mathbf{E}$ and $\mathbf{B}$. Using vector calculus and Maxwell's equations, symmetry is sought for in the terms containing $\mathbf{E}$ and $\mathbf{B}$, and introducing the Maxwell stress tensor simplifies the result.

The derivation follows Griffiths and applies in the case of a vacuum.

Maxwell's equations in SI units in vacuum (for reference)
Name	Differential form
Gauss's law (in vacuum)	$\boldsymbol{\nabla} \cdot \mathbf{E} = \frac {\rho} {\varepsilon_0}$
Gauss's law for magnetism	$\boldsymbol{\nabla} \cdot \mathbf{B} = 0$
Maxwell–Faraday equation (Faraday's law of induction)	$\boldsymbol{\nabla} \times \mathbf{E} = -\frac{\partial \mathbf{B}} {\partial t}$
Ampère's circuital law (in vacuum) (with Maxwell's correction)	$\boldsymbol{\nabla} \times \mathbf{B} = \mu_0 \mathbf{J} + \mu_0 \varepsilon_0 \frac{\partial \mathbf{E}} {\partial t}\$

1. Starting with the Lorentz force law
  $$\begin{align}
\mathbf{F} &= q(\mathbf{E} + \mathbf{v} \times \mathbf{B}) \\[3pt]
&= \int (\mathbf{E} + \mathbf{v} \times \mathbf{B})\rho \mathrm{d}\tau
\end{align}$$
  the force per unit volume is
  $$\mathbf{f} = \rho\mathbf{E} + \mathbf{J} \times \mathbf{B}$$
2. Next, $\rho$ and $\mathbf{J}$ can be replaced by the fields $\mathbf{E}$ and $\mathbf{B}$, using Gauss's law and Ampère's circuital law:
  $$\mathbf{f} = \varepsilon_0\left(\boldsymbol{\nabla} \cdot \mathbf{E}\right)\mathbf{E} +
\frac{1}{\mu_0}\left(\boldsymbol{\nabla} \times \mathbf{B}\right) \times \mathbf{B} -
\varepsilon_0\frac{\partial\mathbf{E}}{\partial t} \times \mathbf{B}$$
3. The time derivative can be rewritten to something that can be interpreted physically, namely the Poynting vector. Using the product rule and Faraday's law of induction gives
  $$\frac{\partial}{\partial t} (\mathbf{E} \times \mathbf{B}) =
\frac{\partial\mathbf{E}}{\partial t} \times \mathbf{B} + \mathbf{E} \times \frac{\partial\mathbf{B}}{\partial t} =
\frac{\partial\mathbf{E}}{\partial t} \times \mathbf{B} - \mathbf{E} \times (\boldsymbol{\nabla} \times \mathbf{E})$$
  and we can now rewrite $\mathbf{f}$ as
  $$\mathbf{f} =
\varepsilon_0\left(\boldsymbol{\nabla} \cdot \mathbf{E}\right)\mathbf{E} +
\frac{1}{\mu_0}\left(\boldsymbol{\nabla} \times \mathbf{B}\right) \times \mathbf{B} -
\varepsilon_0\frac{\partial}{\partial t} \left(\mathbf{E} \times \mathbf{B}\right) -
\varepsilon_0\mathbf{E} \times (\boldsymbol{\nabla} \times \mathbf{E}),$$
  then collecting terms with $\mathbf{E}$ and $\mathbf{B}$ gives
  $$\mathbf{f} = \varepsilon_0\left[(\boldsymbol{\nabla} \cdot \mathbf{E}) \mathbf{E} - \mathbf{E} \times (\boldsymbol{\nabla} \times \mathbf{E})\right] +
\frac{1}{\mu_0}\left[-\mathbf{B} \times \left(\boldsymbol{\nabla} \times \mathbf{B}\right)\right] -
\varepsilon_0\frac{\partial}{\partial t} \left(\mathbf{E} \times \mathbf{B}\right).$$
4. A term seems to be "missing" from the symmetry in $\mathbf{E}$ and $\mathbf{B}$, which can be achieved by inserting $\left(\boldsymbol{\nabla} \cdot \mathbf{B}\right)\mathbf{B}$ because of Gauss's law for magnetism:
  $$\mathbf{f} = \varepsilon_0\left[(\boldsymbol{\nabla} \cdot \mathbf{E})\mathbf{E} - \mathbf{E} \times (\boldsymbol{\nabla} \times \mathbf{E})\right] +
\frac{1}{\mu_0}\left[(\boldsymbol{\nabla} \cdot \mathbf{B})\mathbf{B} - \mathbf{B} \times \left(\boldsymbol{\nabla} \times \mathbf{B}\right)\right] -
\varepsilon_0\frac{\partial}{\partial t}\left(\mathbf{E} \times \mathbf{B}\right).$$
  Eliminating the curls (which are fairly complicated to calculate), using the vector calculus identity
  $$\frac{1}{2}\boldsymbol{\nabla}(\mathbf{A} \cdot \mathbf{A}) =
\mathbf{A} \times (\boldsymbol{\nabla} \times \mathbf{A}) + (\mathbf{A} \cdot \boldsymbol{\nabla})\mathbf{A},$$
  leads to:
  $$\mathbf{f} = \varepsilon_0\left[(\boldsymbol{\nabla} \cdot \mathbf{E})\mathbf{E} + (\mathbf{E} \cdot \boldsymbol{\nabla})\mathbf{E}\right] +
\frac{1}{\mu_0}\left[(\boldsymbol{\nabla} \cdot \mathbf{B})\mathbf{B} + (\mathbf{B} \cdot \boldsymbol{\nabla})\mathbf{B}\right] -
\frac{1}{2}\boldsymbol{\nabla}\left(\varepsilon_0 E^2 + \frac{1}{\mu_0} B^2\right) -
\varepsilon_0\frac{\partial}{\partial t} \left(\mathbf{E} \times \mathbf{B}\right).$$
5. This expression contains every aspect of electromagnetism and momentum and is relatively easy to compute. It can be written more compactly by introducing the Maxwell stress tensor,
  $$\sigma_{ij} \equiv \varepsilon_0\left(E_i E_j - \frac{1}{2} \delta_{ij}E^2\right) +
\frac{1}{\mu_0} \left(B_i B_j - \frac{1}{2} \delta_{ij}B^2\right)
.$$
  All but the last term of $\mathbf{f}$ can be written as the tensor divergence of the Maxwell stress tensor, giving:
  $$\boldsymbol{\nabla} \cdot \boldsymbol{\sigma} = \mathbf{f} + \varepsilon_0 \mu_0 \frac{\partial\mathbf{S}}{\partial t}\,,$$
  As in the Poynting's theorem, the second term on the right side of the above equation can be interpreted as the time derivative of the EM field's momentum density, while the first term is the time derivative of the momentum density for the massive particles. In this way, the above equation will be the law of conservation of momentum in classical electrodynamics; where the Poynting vector,
  $$\mathbf{S} = \frac{1}{\mu_0} \mathbf{E} \times\mathbf{B},$$
  has been introduced. In the above relation for conservation of momentum, $\boldsymbol{\nabla} \cdot \boldsymbol{\sigma}$ is the momentum flux density and plays a role similar to $\mathbf{S}$ in Poynting's theorem.

== In magnetostatics ==
If the field is only magnetic (which is largely true in motors, for instance), some of the terms drop out, and the equation in SI units becomes:
$$\sigma_{ij} = \frac{1}{\mu_0} B_i B_j - \frac{B^2}{2\mu_0} \delta_{ij} \,.$$

== In electrostatics ==
In electrostatics the effects of magnetism are not present. In this case the magnetic field vanishes, i.e. $\mathbf{B} = \mathbf{0}$, and we obtain the electrostatic Maxwell stress tensor. It is given in component form by
$$\sigma_{ij} = \varepsilon_0 E_i E_j - \frac{\varepsilon_0}{2} E^2\delta_{ij}$$
and in symbolic form by
$$\boldsymbol{\sigma} = \varepsilon_0\mathbf{E} \otimes \mathbf{E} - \frac{1}{2}\varepsilon_0 \left(\mathbf{E} \cdot \mathbf{E}\right) \mathbf{I}$$
where $\mathbf{I}$ is the appropriate identity tensor $\big($usually $3\times3\big)$.

== Eigenvalue ==
The eigenvalues of the Maxwell stress tensor are given by:
$$\lambda = -\frac{\varepsilon_0}{2} E^2 - \frac{B^2}{2\mu_0} ,~ \pm\sqrt{\left(\frac{\varepsilon_0}{2}E^2 - \frac{B^2}{2\mu_0}\right)^2 + \frac{\varepsilon_0}{\mu_0} \left(\mathbf{E} \cdot \mathbf{B}\right)^2}$$

These eigenvalues are obtained by iteratively applying the matrix determinant lemma, in conjunction with the Sherman–Morrison formula.

Noting that the characteristic equation matrix, $\boldsymbol{\sigma} - \lambda\mathbf{\mathbb{I}}$, can be written as
$$\boldsymbol{\sigma} - \lambda\mathbf{\mathbb{I}} = -\left(\lambda + V\right)\mathbf{\mathbb{I}} + \varepsilon_0\mathbf{E}\mathbf{E}^\textsf{T} + \frac{1}{\mu_0}\mathbf{B}\mathbf{B}^\textsf{T}$$
where
$$V = \frac{1}{2}\left(\varepsilon_0 E^2 + \frac{1}{\mu_0}B^2\right)$$
we set
$$\mathbf{U} = -\left(\lambda + V\right)\mathbf{\mathbb{I}} + \varepsilon_0\mathbf{E}\mathbf{E}^\textsf{T}$$

Applying the matrix determinant lemma once, this gives us
$$\det{\left(\boldsymbol{\sigma} - \lambda\mathbf{\mathbb{I}}\right)} = \left(1 + \frac{1}{\mu_0}\mathbf{B}^\textsf{T}\mathbf{U}^{-1}\mathbf{B}\right)\det{\left(\mathbf{U}\right)}$$

Applying it again yields,
$$\det{\left(\boldsymbol{\sigma} - \lambda\mathbf{\mathbb{I}}\right)} = \left(1 + \frac{1}{\mu_0}\mathbf{B}^\textsf{T}\mathbf{U}^{-1}\mathbf{B}\right) \left(1 - \frac{\varepsilon_0\mathbf{E}^\textsf{T}\mathbf{E}}{\lambda + V}\right) \left(-\lambda - V\right)^3$$

From the last multiplicand on the RHS, we immediately see that $\lambda = -V$ is one of the eigenvalues.

To find the inverse of $\mathbf{U}$, we use the Sherman-Morrison formula:
$$\mathbf{U}^{-1} = -\left(\lambda + V\right)^{-1} - \frac{\varepsilon_0 \mathbf{E}\mathbf{E}^\textsf{T}}{\left(\lambda + V\right)^2 - \left(\lambda + V\right) \varepsilon_0\mathbf{E}^\textsf{T}\mathbf{E}}$$

Factoring out a $\left(-\lambda - V \right)$ term in the determinant, we are left with finding the zeros of the rational function:
$$\left[-\left(\lambda + V\right) - \frac{\varepsilon_0\left(\mathbf{E} \cdot \mathbf{B}\right)^2}{\mu_0\left(-\left(\lambda + V\right) + \varepsilon_0\mathbf{E}^\textsf{T}\mathbf{E}\right)}\right] \left[-\left(\lambda + V\right) + \varepsilon_0\mathbf{E}^\textsf{T} \mathbf{E}\right]$$

Thus, once we solve
$$-\left(\lambda + V\right) \left(-\left(\lambda + V\right) + \varepsilon_0 E^2\right) - \frac{\varepsilon_0}{\mu_0}\left(\mathbf{E} \cdot \mathbf{B}\right)^2 = 0$$
we obtain the other two eigenvalues.

== See also ==
- Electromagnetic stress–energy tensor
- Energy density of electric and magnetic fields
- Magnetic pressure
- Magnetic tension
- Poynting vector
