= Stress–energy tensor =

Tensor describing energy momentum density in spacetime

Contravariant components of the stress–energy tensor.

The stress–energy tensor, sometimes called the stress–energy–momentum tensor or the energy–momentum tensor, is a tensor field quantity that describes the density and flux of energy and momentum at each point in spacetime, generalizing the stress tensor of Newtonian physics. It is an attribute of matter, radiation, and non-gravitational force fields. This density and flux of energy and momentum are the sources of the gravitational field in the Einstein field equations of general relativity, just as mass density is the source of such a field in Newtonian gravity.

The electromagnetic stress–energy tensor was introduced by Hermann Minkowski in 1907, and later generalized by Max von Laue in 1911.

== Definition ==
The stress–energy tensor involves the use of superscripted variables (not exponents; see Tensor index notation and Einstein summation notation). The four coordinates of an event of spacetime x are given by x^{0}, x^{1}, x^{2}, x^{3}. These are customarily set as t, x, y, z, where t is the time coordinate, and x, y, and z are spatial coordinates.

The stress–energy tensor is defined as the tensor T^{αβ} of order two that gives the flux of the αth component of the momentum vector across a surface with constant coordinate x^{β}. In the theory of relativity, this momentum vector is taken as the four-momentum. In general relativity, the stress–energy tensor is symmetric, (Note: "All the stress–energy tensors explored above were symmetric. That they could not have been otherwise one sees as follows." — Misner, Thorne, and Wheeler)
$$T^{\alpha \beta} = T^{\beta \alpha} .$$

In some alternative theories like Einstein–Cartan theory, the stress–energy tensor may not be perfectly symmetric because of a nonzero spin tensor, which geometrically corresponds to a nonzero torsion tensor.

== Components ==
Because the stress–energy tensor is of order 2, its components can be displayed in 4 × 4 matrix form:
$$T^{\mu\nu} = \begin{pmatrix} T^{00} & T^{01} & T^{02} & T^{03} \\ T^{10} & T^{11} & T^{12} & T^{13} \\ T^{20} & T^{21} & T^{22} & T^{23} \\ T^{30} & T^{31} & T^{32} & T^{33} \end{pmatrix}\,,$$
where the indices μ and ν take on the values 0, 1, 2, 3. Each component of the stress–energy tensor has a direct physical interpretation.

In the following, k and ℓ range from 1 through 3. (Note: For a convention in which the coordinates of a displacement vector x^{μ} are [ct, x, y, z], T^{00} will be energy density, and T^{0k} will be areal density of the rate of momentum transfer.)

1. The time–time component is the density of relativistic mass, i.e., the energy density divided by the speed of light squared. This component is
  $$T^{00} = \rho~,$$
  where $\rho$ is the relativistic mass density.
2. The areal density rate of relativistic mass flux across the x^{k} surface is equal to the kth component of momentum density,
  $$T^{0k} = T^{k0}~.$$
3. The components
  $$T^{k\ell}$$
  represent the areal flux density rate of the kth component of momentum across the x^{ℓ} surface (compare with the Cauchy stress tensor). In particular,
  $$T^{kk}$$
  (not summed) represents normal stress in the kth co-ordinate direction (k = 1, 2, 3), which may be thought of as the pressure in the direction indexed by k. The remaining components ($k \ne \ell$)
  $$T^{k\ell}$$
  represent shear stress.

In solid state physics and fluid mechanics, the stress tensor is defined to be the spatial components of the stress–energy tensor in the proper frame of reference. In other words, the stress–energy tensor in engineering differs from the relativistic stress–energy tensor by a momentum-convective term.

=== Covariant and mixed forms ===
Most of this article works with the contravariant form, T^{μν} of the stress–energy tensor. However, it is often convenient to work with the covariant form,
$$T_{\mu \nu} = T^{\alpha \beta} g_{\alpha \mu} g_{\beta \nu} ,$$
or the mixed form,
$$T^\mu{}_\nu = T^{\mu \alpha} g_{\alpha \nu} .$$

This article uses the spacelike sign convention (− + + +) for the metric signature.

== Conservation law ==
=== In special relativity ===
The stress–energy tensor is the conserved Noether current associated with spacetime translations.

The divergence of the non-gravitational stress–energy is zero. In other words, non-gravitational energy and momentum are conserved,
$$0 = T^{\mu \nu}{}_{;\nu}\ \equiv\ \nabla_\nu T^{\mu \nu}.$$

The integral form of the non-covariant formulation is
$$0 = \int_{\partial N} T^{\mu \nu} \mathrm{d}^3 s_{\nu}$$
where N is any compact four-dimensional region of spacetime; $\partial N$ is its boundary, a three-dimensional hypersurface; and $\mathrm{d}^3 s_{\nu}$ is an element of the boundary regarded as the outward pointing normal.

In flat spacetime and using linear coordinates, if one combines this with the symmetry of the stress–energy tensor, one can show that angular momentum is also conserved:
$$0 = (x^{\alpha} T^{\mu \nu} - x^{\mu} T^{\alpha \nu})_{,\nu} \,.$$

=== In general relativity ===
When gravity is non-negligible or when using arbitrary coordinate systems, the divergence of the stress–energy still vanishes. But in this case, a covariant variation of divergence is used
$$0 = T^{\mu \nu}{}_{;\nu} = \nabla_{\nu} T^{\mu \nu} = T^{\mu \nu}{}_{,\nu} +  \Gamma^{\mu}{}_{\sigma \nu}T^{\sigma \nu} + \Gamma^{\nu}{}_{\sigma \nu} T^{\mu \sigma}$$
where $\Gamma^{\mu}{}_{\sigma \nu}$ is the Christoffel symbol, which is the gravitational force field.

If $\xi^{\mu}$ is any Killing vector field then the covariant divergence can be related back to the ordinary divergence and the conservation law associated with it.
$$0 = \nabla_\nu \left(\xi_{\mu} T^{\mu\nu}\right) = \frac{1}{\sqrt{-g}} \partial_\nu \left(\sqrt{-g}\ \xi_{\mu} T^{\mu\nu}\right)$$

The integral form of this is
$$0 = \int_{\partial N} \xi_{\mu} T^{\mu\nu} \sqrt{-g} \ \mathrm{d}^3 s_{\nu}\,.$$

== In special relativity ==
In special relativity, the stress–energy tensor contains information about the energy and momentum densities of a given system, in addition to the momentum and energy flux densities.

Given a Lagrangian density $\mathcal{L}$ that is a function of a set of fields $\phi_{\alpha}$ and their derivatives, but explicitly not of any of the spacetime coordinates, we can construct the canonical stress–energy tensor by looking at the total derivative with respect to one of the generalized coordinates of the system. So, with our condition
$$\frac{\partial \mathcal{L}}{\partial x^{\nu}} = 0$$

By using the chain rule, we then have
$$\frac{d \mathcal{L}}{dx^{\nu}} = d_{\nu}\mathcal{L} = \frac{\partial \mathcal{L}}{\partial(\partial_{\mu}\phi_{\alpha})}\frac{\partial(\partial_{\mu}\phi_{\alpha})}{\partial x^{\nu}} + \frac{\partial \mathcal{L}}{\partial \phi_{\alpha}}\frac{\partial \phi_{\alpha}}{\partial x^{\nu}}$$

Written in useful shorthand,
$$d_{\nu}\mathcal{L} = \frac{\partial \mathcal{L}}{\partial(\partial_{\mu}\phi_{\alpha})}\partial_{\nu}\partial_{\mu}\phi_{\alpha} + \frac{\partial \mathcal{L}}{\partial \phi_{\alpha}}\partial_{\nu}\phi_{\alpha}$$

Then, we can use the Euler–Lagrange Equation:
$$\partial_{\mu}\left(\frac{\partial \mathcal{L}}{\partial(\partial_{\mu}\phi_{\alpha})}\right) = \frac{\partial\mathcal{L}}{\partial \phi_{\alpha}}$$

And then use the fact that partial derivatives commute so that we now have
$$d_{\nu}\mathcal{L} = \frac{\partial \mathcal{L}}{\partial(\partial_{\mu}\phi_{\alpha})}\partial_{\mu}\partial_{\nu}\phi_{\alpha} + \partial_{\mu}\left(\frac{\partial \mathcal{L}}{\partial(\partial_{\mu}\phi_{\alpha})}\right)\partial_{\nu}\phi_{\alpha}$$

We can recognize the right hand side as a product rule. Writing it as the derivative of a product of functions tells us that
$$d_{\nu}\mathcal{L} = \partial_{\mu}\left[\frac{\partial \mathcal{L}}{\partial(\partial_{\mu}\phi_{\alpha})}\partial_{\nu}\phi_{\alpha}\right]$$

Now, in flat space, one can write $d_{\nu}\mathcal{L} = \partial_{\mu}[\delta^{\mu}_{\nu}\mathcal{L}]$. Doing this and moving it to the other side of the equation tells us that
$$\partial_{\mu}\left[\frac{\partial \mathcal{L}}{\partial(\partial_{\mu}\phi_{\alpha})}\partial_{\nu}\phi_{\alpha}\right] - \partial_{\mu}\left(\delta^{\mu}_{\nu}\mathcal{L}\right) = 0$$

And upon regrouping terms,
$$\partial_{\mu}\left[\frac{\partial \mathcal{L}}{\partial(\partial_{\mu}\phi_{\alpha})}\partial_{\nu}\phi_{\alpha} - \delta^{\mu}_{\nu}\mathcal{L}\right] = 0$$

This is to say that the divergence of the tensor in the brackets is 0. Indeed, with this, we define the stress–energy tensor:
$$T^{\mu}{}_{\nu} \equiv \frac{\partial \mathcal{L}}{\partial(\partial_{\mu}\phi_{\alpha})}\partial_{\nu}\phi_{\alpha} - \delta^{\mu}_{\nu}\mathcal{L}$$

By construction it has the property that
$$\partial_{\mu}T^{\mu}{}_{\nu} = 0$$

Note that this divergenceless property of this tensor is equivalent to four continuity equations. That is, fields have at least four sets of quantities that obey the continuity equation. As an example, it can be seen that $T^{0}{}_{0}$ is the energy density of the system and that it is thus possible to obtain the Hamiltonian density from the stress–energy tensor.

Indeed, since this is the case, observing that $\partial_{\mu}T^{\mu}{}_{0} = 0$, we then have
$$\frac{\partial \mathcal{H}}{\partial t} + \nabla\cdot\left(\frac{\partial \mathcal{L}}{\partial\nabla \phi_{\alpha}}\dot{\phi}_{\alpha}\right) = 0$$

We can then conclude that the terms of $\frac{\partial \mathcal{L}}{\partial\nabla \phi_{\alpha}}\dot{\phi}_{\alpha}$ represent the energy flux density of the system.

=== Trace ===
The trace of the stress–energy tensor is defined to be $T^{\mu}{}_{\mu}$, so
$$T^{\mu}{}_{\mu} = \frac{\partial \mathcal{L}}{\partial(\partial_{\mu}\phi_{\alpha})}\partial_{\mu}\phi_{\alpha}-\delta^{\mu}_{\mu}\mathcal{L} .$$

Since $\delta^{\mu}_{\mu} = 4$,
$$T^{\mu}{}_{\mu} = \frac{\partial \mathcal{L}}{\partial(\partial_{\mu}\phi_{\alpha})}\partial_{\mu}\phi_{\alpha}-4\mathcal{L} .$$

== In general relativity ==
In general relativity, the symmetric stress–energy tensor acts as the source of spacetime curvature, and is the current density associated with gauge transformations of gravity which are general curvilinear coordinate transformations. (If there is torsion, then the tensor is no longer symmetric. This corresponds to the case with a nonzero spin tensor in Einstein–Cartan gravity theory.)

In general relativity, the partial derivatives used in special relativity are replaced by covariant derivatives. What this means is that the continuity equation no longer implies that the non-gravitational energy and momentum expressed by the tensor are absolutely conserved, i.e. the gravitational field can do work on matter and vice versa. In the classical limit of Newtonian gravity, this has a simple interpretation: kinetic energy is being exchanged with gravitational potential energy, which is not included in the tensor, and momentum is being transferred through the field to other bodies. In general relativity the Landau–Lifshitz pseudotensor is a unique way to define the gravitational field energy and momentum densities. Any such stress–energy pseudotensor can be made to vanish locally by a coordinate transformation.

In curved spacetime, the spacelike integral now depends on the spacelike slice, in general. There is in fact no way to define a global energy–momentum vector in a general curved spacetime.

=== Einstein field equations ===
In general relativity, the stress–energy tensor is studied in the context of the Einstein field equations which are often written as
$$G_{\mu \nu} + \Lambda g_{\mu \nu} = \kappa T_{\mu \nu} ,$$
where $G_{\mu \nu} = R_{\mu \nu} - \tfrac{1}{2} R\,g_{\mu \nu}$ is the Einstein tensor, $R_{\mu \nu}$ is the Ricci tensor, $R = g^{\alpha \beta}R_{\alpha \beta}$ is the scalar curvature, $g_{\mu \nu}\,$ is the metric tensor, Λ is the cosmological constant (negligible at the scale of a galaxy or smaller), and $\kappa = 8\pi G/c^4$ is the Einstein gravitational constant.

== Stress–energy in special situations ==
=== Isolated particle ===
In special relativity, the stress–energy of a non-interacting particle with rest mass m and trajectory $\mathbf{x}_\text{p}(t)$ is:
$$\begin{align}
T^{\alpha \beta}(\mathbf{x}, t) &= \frac{m \, v^{\alpha}(t) v^{\beta}(t)}{\sqrt{1 - (v/c)^2}}\;\, \delta{\left(\mathbf{x} - \mathbf{x}_\text{p}(t)\right)} \\[1ex]
&= \frac{E}{c^2}\; v^{\alpha}(t) v^{\beta}(t)\;\, \delta{\left(\mathbf{x} - \mathbf{x}_\text{p}(t)\right)}
\end{align}$$
where $v^{\alpha}$ is the velocity vector (which should not be confused with four-velocity, since it is missing a $\gamma$)
$$v^{\alpha} = \left(1, \frac{d \mathbf{x}_\text{p}}{dt}(t) \right) \,,$$
$\delta$ is the Dirac delta function and $E = \sqrt{p^2 c^2 + m^2 c^4}$ is the energy of the particle.

Written in the language of classical physics, the stress–energy tensor would be (relativistic mass, momentum, the dyadic product of momentum and velocity)
$$\left( \frac{E}{c^2} , \, \mathbf{p} , \, \mathbf{p} \, \mathbf{v} \right) \,.$$

=== Stress–energy of a fluid in equilibrium ===
For a perfect fluid, the stress–energy tensor takes on the form
$$T^{\alpha\beta} = \left(\rho + \frac{p}{c^2}\right) u^{\alpha} \, u^{\beta} + p \, g^{\alpha\beta},$$
where $\rho$ is the mass density and $p$ is the isotropic pressure in the rest frame, $u^{\alpha}$ is the fluid's four-velocity, and $g^{\alpha \beta}$ is the matrix inverse of the metric tensor. Therefore, its trace with respect to the metric is given by
$${T^{\alpha}}_{\alpha} = g_{\alpha\beta} \, T^{\alpha\beta} = -\rho \, c^2 + 3p.$$

The four-velocity satisfies
$$g_{\alpha\beta} \, u^{\alpha} \, u^{\beta} = -c^2.$$

In the fluid's proper frame of reference, the four-velocity is
$$u^{\alpha} = (1, 0, 0, 0),$$

the matrix inverse of the metric tensor is
$$g^{\alpha\beta} = \left( \begin{matrix}{rccc}
-c^{-2} & 0 & 0 & 0 \\
0 & 1 & 0 & 0 \\
0 & 0 & 1 & 0 \\
0 & 0 & 0 & 1
\end{matrix} \right)\!,$$
and the stress–energy tensor can be represented by a diagonal matrix:
$$T^{\alpha\beta} = \left( \begin{matrix}
\rho & 0 & 0 & 0 \\
0 & p & 0 & 0 \\
0 & 0 & p & 0 \\
0 & 0 & 0 & p
\end{matrix} \right)\!.$$

=== Electromagnetic stress–energy tensor ===
The Hilbert stress–energy tensor of a source-free electromagnetic field is
$$T^{\mu \nu} = \frac{1}{\mu_0} \left( F^{\mu \alpha} g_{\alpha \beta} F^{\nu \beta} - \frac{1}{4} g^{\mu \nu} F_{\delta \gamma} F^{\delta \gamma} \right)$$
where $F_{\mu \nu}$ is the electromagnetic field tensor.

=== Scalar field ===
The stress–energy tensor for a complex scalar field $\phi$ that satisfies the Klein–Gordon equation is
$$T^{\mu\nu} = \frac{\hbar^2}{m} \left(g^{\mu \alpha} g^{\nu \beta} + g^{\mu \beta} g^{\nu \alpha} - g^{\mu\nu} g^{\alpha \beta}\right) \partial_{\alpha}\bar\phi \partial_{\beta}\phi - g^{\mu\nu} m c^2 \bar\phi \phi ,$$
and when the metric is flat (Minkowski in Cartesian coordinates) its components work out to be:
$$\begin{align}
T^{00} & = \frac{\hbar^2}{m c^4} \left(\partial_0 \bar{\phi} \partial_0 \phi + c^2 \partial_k \bar{\phi} \partial_k \phi \right) + m \bar{\phi} \phi, \\
T^{0i} = T^{i0} & = - \frac{\hbar^2}{m c^2} \left(\partial_0 \bar{\phi} \partial_i \phi + \partial_i \bar{\phi} \partial_0 \phi \right),\ \mathrm{and} \\
T^{ij} & = \frac{\hbar^2}{m} \left(\partial_i \bar{\phi} \partial_j \phi + \partial_j \bar{\phi} \partial_i \phi \right) - \delta_{ij} \left(\frac{\hbar^2}{m} \eta^{\alpha\beta} \partial_\alpha \bar{\phi} \partial_\beta \phi + m c^2 \bar{\phi} \phi\right).
\end{align}$$

== Variant definitions of stress–energy ==
There are a number of inequivalent definitions of non-gravitational stress–energy:

=== Hilbert stress–energy tensor ===
The Hilbert stress–energy tensor is defined as the functional derivative
$$T_{\mu\nu} =
\frac{-2}{\sqrt{-g}}\frac{\delta S_{\mathrm{matter}}}{\delta g^{\mu\nu}} =
\frac{-2}{\sqrt{-g}}\frac{\partial\left(\sqrt{-g}\mathcal{L}_{\mathrm{matter}}\right)}{\partial g^{\mu\nu}} =
-2 \frac{\partial \mathcal{L}_\mathrm{matter}}{\partial g^{\mu\nu}} + g_{\mu\nu} \mathcal{L}_\mathrm{matter},$$
where $S_{\mathrm{matter}}$ is the nongravitational part of the action, $\mathcal{L}_{\mathrm{matter}}$ is the nongravitational part of the Lagrangian density, and the Euler–Lagrange equation has been used. This is symmetric and gauge-invariant. See Einstein–Hilbert action for more information.

=== Canonical stress–energy tensor ===
Noether's theorem implies that there is a conserved current associated with translations through space and time; for details see the section above on the stress–energy tensor in special relativity. This is called the canonical stress–energy tensor. Generally, this is not symmetric and if we have some gauge theory, it may not be gauge invariant because space-dependent gauge transformations do not commute with spatial translations.

In general relativity, the translations are with respect to the coordinate system and as such, do not transform covariantly. See the section below on the gravitational stress–energy pseudotensor.

=== Belinfante–Rosenfeld stress–energy tensor ===
In the presence of spin or other intrinsic angular momentum, the canonical Noether stress–energy tensor fails to be symmetric. The Belinfante–Rosenfeld stress–energy tensor is constructed from the canonical stress–energy tensor and the spin current in such a way as to be symmetric and still conserved. In general relativity, this modified tensor agrees with the Hilbert stress–energy tensor.

== Gravitational stress–energy ==
Since by the equivalence principle, gravitational stress–energy will always vanish locally at any chosen point in some chosen frame, gravitational stress–energy cannot be expressed as a non-zero tensor; instead, we have to use a pseudotensor.

In general relativity, there are many possible distinct definitions of the gravitational stress–energy–momentum pseudotensor. These include the Einstein pseudotensor and the Landau–Lifshitz pseudotensor. The Landau–Lifshitz pseudotensor can be reduced to zero at any event in spacetime by choosing an appropriate coordinate system.

== See also ==
- Electromagnetic stress–energy tensor
- Energy condition
- Energy density of electric and magnetic fields
- Maxwell stress tensor
- Poynting vector
- Ricci calculus
- Segre classification
