= Electromagnetic tensor =

Mathematical object that describes the electromagnetic field in spacetime

In electromagnetism, the electromagnetic tensor or electromagnetic field tensor (sometimes called the field strength tensor, Faraday tensor or Maxwell bivector) is a tensor that describes the electromagnetic field in spacetime. The EM tensor field was developed by Arnold Sommerfeld after the four-dimensional tensor formulation of special relativity was introduced by Hermann Minkowski. The EM tensor allows related physical laws to be written concisely, and allows for the quantization of the electromagnetic field by a Lagrangian formulation.

== Definition ==
The electromagnetic tensor, conventionally labelled F, is defined as the exterior derivative of the electromagnetic four-potential, A, a differential 1-form:

$$F \ \stackrel{\mathrm{def}}{=}\ \mathrm{d}A.$$

Therefore, F is a differential 2-form— an antisymmetric rank-2 tensor field—on Minkowski space. In component form,

$$F_{\mu\nu} = \partial_\mu A_\nu - \partial_\nu A_\mu.$$

where $\partial$ is the four-gradient and $A$ is the four-potential.

SI units for Maxwell's equations and the particle physicist's sign convention for the signature of Minkowski space (+ − − −), will be used throughout this article.

=== Relationship with the classical fields ===
The Faraday differential 2-form is given by

$$\begin{align}
F ={}&(E_x/c)\ dx \wedge dt + (E_y/c)\ dy \wedge dt + (E_z/c)\ dz \wedge dt \\
&+ B_x\ dy \wedge dz + B_y\ dz \wedge dx + B_z\ dx \wedge dy,
\end{align}$$

where $dt$ is the time element times the speed of light $c$.

This is the exterior derivative of its 1-form antiderivative, the covariant form of the four-potential, is

$$A = (\phi/c)\, dt - A_x\, dx - A_y\, dy - A_z\, dz,$$

where $\phi(\mathbf{x},t)$ has $-\boldsymbol{\nabla}\phi = \mathbf{E}$ ($\phi$ is a scalar potential for the irrotational/conservative vector field $\mathbf{E}$) and $\mathbf{A}(\mathbf{x},t)$ has $\boldsymbol{\nabla} \times \mathbf{A} = \mathbf{B}$ ($\mathbf{A}$ is a vector potential for the solenoidal vector field $\mathbf{B}$).

The electric and magnetic fields can be obtained from the components of the electromagnetic tensor. The relationship is simplest in Cartesian coordinates:

$$E_i = c F_{0i},$$
where c is the speed of light, and
$$B_i = -\tfrac{1}{2} \varepsilon_{ijk} F^{jk},$$
where $\varepsilon_{ijk}$ is the Levi-Civita tensor. This gives the fields in a particular reference frame; if the reference frame is changed, the components of the electromagnetic tensor will transform covariantly, and the fields in the new frame will be given by the new components.

In contravariant matrix form with metric signature (+,−,−,−),
$$F^{\mu\nu} = \begin{bmatrix}
0     & -E_x/c & -E_y/c & -E_z/c \\
E_x/c &  0     & -B_z   &  B_y    \\
E_y/c &  B_z   &  0     & -B_x   \\
E_z/c & -B_y   &  B_x   &  0
\end{bmatrix}.$$

The covariant form is given by index lowering,

$$\begin{align}
F_{\mu\nu} &= \eta_{\alpha\nu} F^{\beta\alpha} \eta_{\mu\beta} \\[1ex]
&= \begin{bmatrix}
0     &  E_x/c &  E_y/c &  E_z/c \\
-E_x/c &  0     & -B_z   &  B_y    \\
-E_y/c &  B_z   &  0     & -B_x   \\
-E_z/c & -B_y   &  B_x   &  0
\end{bmatrix}.
\end{align}$$
The Faraday tensor's Hodge dual is
$$\begin{align}
G^{\alpha\beta} &= \tfrac{1}{2} \varepsilon^{\alpha\beta\gamma\delta}F_{\gamma\delta} \\[1ex]
&= \begin{bmatrix}
0     & -B_x & -B_y & -B_z \\
B_x &  0     & E_z/c   &  -E_y/c    \\
B_y &  -E_z/c   &  0     & E_x/c   \\
B_z &  E_y/c   &  -E_x/c   &  0
\end{bmatrix}
\end{align}$$

From now on in this article, when the electric or magnetic fields are mentioned, a Cartesian coordinate system is assumed, and the electric and magnetic fields are with respect to the coordinate system's reference frame, as in the equations above.

=== Properties ===
The matrix form of the field tensor yields the following properties:

1. Antisymmetry:
  $$F^{\mu\nu} = - F^{\nu\mu}$$
2. Six independent components: In Cartesian coordinates, these are simply the three spatial components of the electric field (E_{x}, E_{y}, E_{z}) and magnetic field (B_{x}, B_{y}, B_{z}).
3. Inner product: If one forms an inner product of the field strength tensor a Lorentz invariant is formed
  $$F_{\mu\nu} F^{\mu\nu} = 2 \left( B^2-\frac{E^2}{c^2} \right)$$
  meaning this number does not change from one frame of reference to another.
4. Pseudoscalar invariant: The product of the tensor $F^{\mu\nu}$ with its Hodge dual $G^{\mu\nu}$ gives a Lorentz invariant:
  $$G_{\gamma\delta}F^{\gamma\delta} = \frac{1}{2}\varepsilon_{\alpha\beta\gamma\delta}F^{\alpha\beta} F^{\gamma\delta} = -\frac{4}{c} \mathbf{B} \cdot \mathbf{E} \,$$
  where $\varepsilon_{\alpha\beta\gamma\delta}$ is the rank-4 Levi-Civita symbol. The sign for the above depends on the convention used for the Levi-Civita symbol. The convention used here is $\varepsilon_{0123} = -1$. This and the previous Lorentz invariant vanish in the crossed field case.
5. Determinant:
  $$\det F = \frac{1}{c^2} \left( \mathbf{B} \cdot \mathbf{E} \right)^2$$
  which is proportional to the square of the above invariant.
6. Trace:
  $$\operatorname{tr} F = {F^{\mu}}_{\mu} = 0$$

=== Significance ===
This tensor simplifies and reduces Maxwell's equations as four vector calculus equations into two tensor field equations. In electrostatics and electrodynamics, Gauss's law and Ampère's circuital law are respectively:

$$\begin{align}
\nabla \cdot \mathbf{E} &= \frac{\rho}{\varepsilon_0}, &
\nabla \times \mathbf{B} & = \frac{1}{c^2} \frac{ \partial \mathbf{E}}{\partial t} + \mu_0 \mathbf{J}
\end{align}$$

and reduce to the inhomogeneous Maxwell equation:

$$\partial_{\alpha} F^{\beta\alpha} = - \mu_0 J^{\beta},$$
where $J^{\alpha} = ( c\rho, \mathbf{J} )$ is the four-current.

In magnetostatics and magnetodynamics, Gauss's law for magnetism and Maxwell–Faraday equation are respectively:

$$\begin{align}
\nabla \cdot \mathbf{B} &= 0, &
\nabla \times \mathbf{E} &= - \frac{ \partial \mathbf{B}}{ \partial t }
\end{align}$$

which reduce to the Bianchi identity:

$$\partial_\gamma F_{ \alpha \beta } + \partial_\alpha F_{ \beta \gamma } + \partial_\beta F_{ \gamma \alpha } = 0$$

or using the index notation with square brackets^{[note 1]} for the antisymmetric part of the tensor:

$$\partial_{ [ \alpha } F_{ \beta \gamma ] } = 0$$
Using the expression relating the Faraday tensor to the four-potential, one can prove that the above antisymmetric quantity turns to zero identically ($\equiv 0$). This tensor equation reproduces the homogeneous Maxwell's equations.

== Relativity ==
The field tensor derives its name from the fact that the electromagnetic field is found to obey the tensor transformation law, this general property of physical laws being recognised after the advent of special relativity. This theory stipulated that all the laws of physics should take the same form in all coordinate systems – this led to the introduction of tensors. The tensor formalism also leads to a mathematically simpler presentation of physical laws.

The inhomogeneous Maxwell equation leads to the continuity equation:

$$\partial_\alpha J^\alpha = J^\alpha{}_{,\alpha} = 0$$

implying conservation of charge.

Maxwell's laws above can be generalised to curved spacetime by simply replacing partial derivatives with covariant derivatives:

$$F_{[\alpha\beta;\gamma]} = 0$$
and $F^{\alpha\beta}{}_{;\alpha} = \mu_0 J^{\beta}$

where the semicolon notation represents a covariant derivative, as opposed to a partial derivative. These equations are sometimes referred to as the curved space Maxwell equations. Again, the second equation implies charge conservation (in curved spacetime):

$$J^\alpha{}_{;\alpha} \, = 0$$

The stress-energy tensor of electromagnetism
$$T^{\mu\nu} = \frac{1}{\mu_0} \left[ F^{\mu \alpha}F^\nu{}_{\alpha} - \frac{1}{4} \eta^{\mu\nu}F_{\alpha\beta} F^{\alpha\beta}\right] \,,$$
satisfies
$${T^{\alpha\beta}}_{,\beta} + F^{\alpha\beta} J_\beta = 0\,.$$

== Lagrangian formulation of classical electromagnetism ==
Classical electromagnetism and Maxwell's equations can be derived from the action:
$$\mathcal{S} = \int \left( -\begin{matrix} \frac{1}{4 \mu_0} \end{matrix} F_{\mu\nu} F^{\mu\nu} - J^\mu A_\mu \right) \mathrm{d}^4 x \,$$
where $\mathrm{d}^4 x$ is over space and time.

This means the Lagrangian density is

$$\begin{align}
\mathcal{L} &= -\frac{1}{4\mu_0} F_{\mu\nu} F^{\mu\nu} - J^\mu A_\mu \\
&= -\frac{1}{4\mu_0} \left( \partial_\mu A_\nu - \partial_\nu A_\mu \right) \left( \partial^\mu A^\nu - \partial^\nu A^\mu \right) - J^\mu A_\mu \\
&= -\frac{1}{4\mu_0} \left( \partial_\mu A_\nu \partial^\mu A^\nu - \partial_\nu A_\mu \partial^\mu A^\nu - \partial_\mu A_\nu \partial^\nu A^\mu + \partial_\nu A_\mu \partial^\nu A^\mu \right) - J^\mu A_\mu \\
\end{align}$$

The two middle terms in the parentheses are the same, as are the two outer terms, so the Lagrangian density is

$$\mathcal{L} = - \frac{1}{2\mu_0} \left( \partial_\mu A_\nu \partial^\mu A^\nu - \partial_\nu A_\mu \partial^\mu A^\nu \right) - J^\mu A_\mu.$$

Substituting this into the Euler–Lagrange equation of motion for a field:

$$\partial_\mu \left( \frac{\partial \mathcal{L}}{\partial ( \partial_\mu A_\nu )} \right) - \frac{\partial \mathcal{L}}{\partial A_\nu} = 0$$

So the Euler–Lagrange equation becomes:

$$- \partial_\mu \frac{1}{\mu_0} \left( \partial^\mu A^\nu - \partial^\nu A^\mu \right) + J^\nu = 0. \,$$

The quantity in parentheses above is just the field tensor, so this finally simplifies to

$$\partial_\mu F^{\mu \nu} = \mu_0 J^\nu$$

That equation is another way of writing the two inhomogeneous Maxwell's equations (namely, Gauss's law and Ampère's circuital law) using the substitutions:

$$\begin{align}
\frac{1}{c}E^i &= -F^{0 i} \\
\varepsilon^{ijk} B_k &= -F^{ij}
\end{align}$$

where i, j, k take the values 1, 2, and 3.

=== Hamiltonian form ===
The Hamiltonian density can be obtained with the usual relation,

$$\mathcal{H}(\phi^i,\pi_i) = \pi_i \dot{\phi}^i(\phi^i,\pi_i) - \mathcal{L} \,.$$

Here $\phi^i=A^{i}$ are the fields and the momentum density of the EM field is

$$\pi_i= T_{0i}=\frac{1}{\mu_0} F_0{}^{ \alpha}F_{i\alpha}=\frac{1}{\mu_0 c} \mathbf{E}\times\mathbf{B} \,.$$
such that the conserved quantity associated with translation from Noether's theorem is the total momentum
$$\mathbf{P}= \sum_{\alpha} m_\alpha \dot{\mathbf{x}}_{\alpha} + \frac{1}{\mu_0 c}\int_{\mathcal{V}} \mathrm{d}^3 x\, \mathbf{E}\times\mathbf{B} \,.$$

The Hamiltonian density for the electromagnetic field is related to the electromagnetic stress-energy tensor
$$T^{\mu\nu} = \frac{1}{\mu_0} \left[ F^{\mu \alpha}F^\nu{}_{\alpha} - \frac{1}{4} \eta^{\mu\nu}F_{\alpha\beta} F^{\alpha\beta}\right]  \,.$$

as

$$\begin{align}
\mathcal{H} = T_{0 0}
&= \frac{1}{2}\left(\varepsilon_0 \mathbf{E}^2+\frac{1}{\mu_0}\mathbf{B}^2\right) \\[1ex]
&= \frac{1}{8\pi}\left(\mathbf{E}^2+\mathbf{B}^2\right)\,.
\end{align}$$

where we have neglected the energy density of matter, assuming only the EM field, and the last equality assumes the CGS system. The momentum of nonrelativistic charges interacting with the EM field in the Coulomb gauge ($\boldsymbol\nabla\cdot \mathbf{A}=\nabla_i A^i = 0$) is

$$\mathbf{p}_\alpha = m_\alpha \dot{\mathbf{x}}_{\alpha} + \frac{q_{\alpha}}{c} \mathbf{A}(\mathbf{x}_\alpha)  \,.$$

The total Hamiltonian of the matter + EM field system is

$$H =  \int_\mathcal{V} d^3 x \,T_{00} = H_\text{mat} + H_\text{em}  \,.$$

where for nonrelativistic point particles in the Coulomb gauge

$$\begin{align}
H_\text{mat} &= \sum_\alpha m_{\alpha} \left|\dot{\mathbf{x}}_{\alpha}\right|^2 + \sum_{\alpha<\beta} \frac{q_{\alpha}q_{\beta}}{\left|\mathbf{x}_{\alpha} - \mathbf{x}_{\beta}\right| } \\[1ex]
&= \sum_\alpha \frac{1}{2m_\alpha} \left[\mathbf{p}_{\alpha} - \frac{q_{\alpha}}{c} \mathbf{A}(\mathbf{x}_\alpha)\right]^2 + \sum_{\alpha<\beta} \frac{q_{\alpha}q_{\beta}}{\left|\mathbf{x}_{\alpha} - \mathbf{x}_{\beta}\right| } \,.
\end{align}$$

where the last term is identically $\frac{1}{8\pi} \int_\mathcal{V} d^3 x \, \mathbf{E}_{\parallel}^2$ where ${E}_{\parallel i} = {\nabla_i}A_0$ and

$$H_\text{em} = \frac{1}{8\pi} \int_\mathcal{V} d^3 x \left(\mathbf{E}_{\perp}^2+\mathbf{B}^2\right) \,.$$
where and ${E}_{\perp i} = -\frac{1}{c}\partial_0 A_i$.

=== Quantum electrodynamics and field theory ===
The Lagrangian of quantum electrodynamics extends beyond the classical Lagrangian established in relativity to incorporate the creation and annihilation of photons (and electrons):

$$\mathcal{L} = \bar\psi \left(i\hbar c \, \gamma^\alpha D_\alpha - mc^2\right) \psi - \frac{1}{4\mu_0} F_{\alpha\beta} F^{\alpha\beta},$$

where the first part in the right hand side, containing the Dirac spinor $\psi$, represents the Dirac field. In quantum field theory it is used as the template for the gauge field strength tensor. By being employed in addition to the local interaction Lagrangian it reprises its usual role in QED.

== See also ==
- Classification of electromagnetic fields
- Covariant formulation of classical electromagnetism
- Electromagnetic stress–energy tensor
- Gluon field strength tensor
- Ricci calculus
- Riemann–Silberstein vector
- Spacetime_algebra#Classical_electromagnetism

== Notes ==
1. By definition,
  $$T_{[abc]} = \frac{1}{3!}(T_{abc} + T_{bca} + T_{cab} - T_{acb} - T_{bac} - T_{cba})$$
  So if
  $$\partial_\gamma F_{ \alpha \beta } + \partial_\alpha F_{ \beta \gamma } + \partial_\beta F_{ \gamma \alpha } = 0$$
  then
  $$\begin{align}
0 & = \begin{matrix} \frac{2}{6} \end{matrix} ( \partial_\gamma F_{ \alpha \beta } + \partial_\alpha F_{ \beta \gamma } + \partial_\beta F_{ \gamma \alpha }) \\
& = \begin{matrix} \frac{1}{6} \end{matrix} \{ \partial_\gamma (2F_{ \alpha \beta }) + \partial_\alpha (2F_{ \beta \gamma }) + \partial_\beta (2F_{ \gamma \alpha }) \} \\
& = \begin{matrix} \frac{1}{6} \end{matrix} \{ \partial_\gamma (F_{ \alpha \beta } - F_{ \beta \alpha}) + \partial_\alpha (F_{ \beta \gamma } - F_{ \gamma \beta}) + \partial_\beta (F_{ \gamma \alpha } - F_{ \alpha \gamma}) \} \\
& = \begin{matrix} \frac{1}{6} \end{matrix} ( \partial_\gamma F_{ \alpha \beta } + \partial_\alpha F_{ \beta \gamma } + \partial_\beta F_{ \gamma \alpha } - \partial_\gamma F_{ \beta \alpha} - \partial_\alpha F_{ \gamma \beta} - \partial_\beta F_{ \alpha \gamma} ) \\
& = \partial_{[ \gamma} F_{ \alpha \beta ]}
\end{align}$$
