= Relativistic electromagnetism =

Physical phenomenon in electromagnetic field theory

Relativistic electromagnetism is a physical phenomenon explained in electromagnetic field theory due to Coulomb's law and Lorentz transformations.

== Electromechanics ==
After Maxwell proposed the differential equation model of the electromagnetic field in 1873, the mechanism of action of fields came into question, for instance in the Kelvin's master class held at Johns Hopkins University in 1884 and commemorated a century later.

The requirement that the equations remain consistent when viewed from various moving observers led to special relativity, a geometric theory of 4-space where intermediation is by light and radiation. The spacetime geometry provided a context for technical description of electric technology, especially generators, motors, and lighting at first. The Coulomb force was generalized to the Lorentz force. For example, with this model transmission lines and power grids were developed and radio frequency communication explored.

An effort to mount a full-fledged electromechanics on a relativistic basis is seen in the work of Leigh Page, from the project outline in 1912 to his textbook Electrodynamics (1940). The interplay (according to the differential equations) of electric and magnetic field as viewed over moving observers is examined. What is charge density in electrostatics becomes proper charge density and generates a magnetic field for a moving observer.

A revival of interest in this method for education and training of electrical and electronics engineers broke out in the 1960s after Richard Feynman's textbook. Rosser's book Classical Electromagnetism via Relativity was popular, as was Anthony French's treatment in his textbook which illustrated diagrammatically the proper charge density. One author proclaimed, "Maxwell — Out of Newton, Coulomb, and Einstein".

The use of retarded potentials to describe electromagnetic fields from source-charges is an expression of relativistic electromagnetism.

== Principle ==
The question of how an electric field in one inertial frame of reference looks in different reference frames moving with respect to the first is crucial to understanding fields created by moving sources. In the special case, the sources that create the field are at rest with respect to one of the reference frames. Given the electric field in the frame where the sources are at rest, one can ask: what is the electric field in some other frame? Knowing the electric field at some point (in space and time) in the rest frame of the sources, and knowing the relative velocity of the two frames provided all the information needed to calculate the electric field at the same point in the other frame. In other words, the electric field in the other frame does not depend on the particular distribution of the source charges, only on the local value of the electric field in the first frame at that point. Thus, the electric field is a complete representation of the influence of the far-away charges.

Alternatively, introductory treatments of magnetism introduce the Biot–Savart law, which describes the magnetic field associated with an electric current. An observer at rest with respect to a system of static, free charges will see no magnetic field. However, a moving observer looking at the same set of charges does perceive a current, and thus a magnetic field. That is, the magnetic field is simply the electric field, as seen in a moving coordinate system.

== Redundancy ==
The title of this article is redundant since all mathematical theories of electromagnetism are relativistic. Indeed, as Einstein wrote, "The special theory of relativity ... was simply a systematic development of the electrodynamics of Clerk Maxwell and Lorentz". Combination of spatial and temporal variables in Maxwell's theory required admission of a four-manifold. Finite light speed and other constant motion lines were described with analytic geometry. Orthogonality of electric and magnetic vector fields in space was extended by hyperbolic orthogonality for the temporal factor.

When Ludwik Silberstein published his textbook The Theory of Relativity (1914) he related the new geometry to electromagnetism. Faraday's law of induction was suggestive to Einstein when he wrote in 1905 about the "reciprocal electrodynamic action of a magnet and a conductor".

Nevertheless, the aspiration, reflected in references for this article, is for an analytic geometry of spacetime and charges providing a deductive route to forces and currents in practice. Such a royal route to electromagnetic understanding may be lacking, but a path has been opened with differential geometry: The tangent space at an event in spacetime is a four-dimensional vector space, operable by linear transformations. Symmetries observed by electricians find expression in linear algebra and differential geometry. Using exterior algebra to construct a 2-form F from electric and magnetic fields, and the implied dual 2-form ★F, the equations dF = 0 and d★F = J (current) express Maxwell's theory with a differential form approach.

== See also ==
- Covariant formulation of classical electromagnetism
- Special relativity
- Liénard–Wiechert potential
- Moving magnet and conductor problem
- Wheeler–Feynman absorber theory
- Paradox of a charge in a gravitational field
