= John Stuart Foster =

Canadian physicist

- Born: May 30, 1890; Clarence, Nova Scotia, Canada
- Died: September 9, 1964 (aged 74); Berkeley, California, United States
- Education: Yale University
- Children: John S. Foster Jr. (son)
- Awards: Henry Marshall Tory Medal (1946); Fellow of the Royal Society
- Scientific career
- Fields: Physics
- Workplaces: McGill University
- Doctoral advisor: Leigh Page; Henry Andrews Bumstead
- Doctoral students: Mary Laura Chalk Rowles

John Stuart Foster FRS FRSC (May 30, 1890 – September 9, 1964) was a Canadian physicist.

== Biography ==
Born in Clarence, Nova Scotia, he completed his Ph.D. at Yale University with a dissertation on the first measurements of the Stark effect in Helium. In 1924 he gained an appointment as assistant professor at McGill University in Montreal, where he taught physics. He became associate professor in 1930.

During World War II he served as a liaison officer for the National Research Council, working at the MIT-run Radiation Laboratory on radar research and development. He developed a fast-scan radar antenna that became known as the "Foster scanner".

He returned to McGill in 1944, where he directed the construction of a 100-MeV cyclotron. This instrument was commissioned in 1949. At the time this was the second largest in the world. From 1952 until 1954 he was chairman of the physics department at McGill. He died in Berkeley, California.

== Legacy ==
The John Stuart Foster Radiation Laboratory and Cyclotron at McGill was named after him in 1964 and this is engraved on the side of the building now known as the M. H. Wong Building.

His son, John Stuart Foster Jr., graduated from the University of California in 1948, then became director of the Lawrence Livermore National Laboratory, director of Defense Research and Engineering for the U.S. Defense Department, and Vice President of T.R.W., Inc.

== Awards and honours ==
- Fellow of the Royal Society of Canada, 1929.
- Awarded Levy Medal, Franklin Institute, 1930.
- Henry Marshall Tory Medal, 1946.
- Elected a Fellow of the Royal Society of London, 1935.
- The crater Foster on the Moon is named after him.
