= Leigh Page =

American theoretical physicist

- Born: October 13, 1884; New Jersey, USA
- Died: September 14, 1952 (aged 67); New Haven, Connecticut, USA
- Education: Yale University
- Known for: Relativistic electromagnetism
- Scientific career
- Fields: Physicist
- Workplaces: Yale University
- Doctoral advisor: Henry Andrews Bumstead
- Doctoral students: John Stuart Foster

Leigh Page (October 13, 1884 – September 14, 1952) was an American theoretical physicist. Chairman of Mathematical Physics at the Sloane Physics Laboratory of Yale University for over three decades, he is the namesake of Yale's Leigh Page Prize Lectures.

== Biography ==
Page was born October 13, 1884, in South Orange, New Jersey to Edward Day Page and Cornelia Lee. He came to the Sheffield Scientific School at Yale in 1909 as an assistant professor in drawing and graduate student under Henry Andrews Bumstead. He switched to physics in 1912, was appointed assistant professor of physics in 1916. He published a survey of "A Century's Progress in Physics" in 1918, and became professor of mathematical physics in 1922, where he remained until his death in 1952. Devoting most of his time to teaching, Page conducted research and wrote several textbooks, which appeared in various editions, often with the assistance of colleague Norman I. Adams. The books Electrodynamics and Introduction to Theoretical Physics "have had a profound influence on the development of many of America's leading mathematical physicists."

In 1967 Yale University sponsored the first of the Leigh Page Prize Lectures, an honor since bestowed on several Nobel laureates and other notable physicists.

== Scientific contributions ==
As a physics educator, Leigh Page was an advocate of the relativistic electromagnetism approach to the field equations. It is common for lecturers to present the Lorentz covariance of these equations, but Page said

As the dependence of electromagnetism on the relativity principle is far more intimate than is suggested by this covariance, it has seemed more logical to derive the electrodynamic equations directly from this principle.

He derived a complete electromagnetic theory, including Maxwell's equations, from only Coulomb's law and the Lorentz transformation.

Page proposed an emission theory that successfully explained blackbody radiation and other phenomena in electrodynamic terms, but was eventually abandoned in favor of later theories of quantum mechanics.

He reported on the photoelectric effect in 1913.

The theory of relativity generally concerns inertial frames of reference while students of dynamics must consider accelerations due to force. A frame of reference under constant acceleration is sometimes described as in hyperbolic motion. In 1936 Page and Adams presented in Physical Review their analysis of constantly accelerating frames as a "new relativity".

== Books ==
- 1922: An Introduction to Electrodynamics from the Standpoint of Electron Theory, D. Van Nostrand Co., link from Internet Archive.
- 1928: (with N.I. Adams) Introduction to Theoretical Physics, D. Van Nostrand Co.
- 1931, 49, 58: (with N.I. Adams) Principles of Electricity, 3rd edition, D. Van Nostrand Co., link from HathiTrust.
- 1940: (with N.I. Adams) Electrodynamics, D. Van Nostrand Co., link from Internet Archive
