= John S. Foster Jr. =

American physicist (1922–2025)

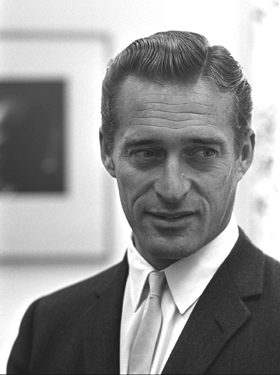
- Foster, c. 1966

Under Secretary of Defense for Research and Engineering
- In office October 1, 1965 – June 21, 1973
- President: Lyndon B. Johnson; Richard Nixon
- Preceded by: Harold Brown
- Succeeded by: Malcolm R. Currie

Personal details
- Born: John Stuart Foster Jr. September 18, 1922 New Haven, Connecticut, U.S.
- Died: April 25, 2025 (aged 102) Santa Barbara, California, U.S.
- Relatives: John Stuart Foster (father)
- Education: McGill University (BS); University of California, Berkeley (MS, PhD)

John Stuart Foster Jr. (September 18, 1922 – April 25, 2025) was an American physicist, best known as the fourth director of Lawrence Livermore National Laboratory and as Director, Defense Research and Engineering under four Secretaries of Defense and two Presidents.

== Early life and education ==
Foster was born September 18, 1922, in New Haven, Connecticut. He received his Bachelor of Science degree in 1948 from McGill University, where his father, Canadian physicist John S. Foster, Sr., was a faculty member. He received his bachelor's from McGill University in 1948 and his doctorate in physics from the University of California, Berkeley in 1952, while serving as a staff member of the university's Lawrence Livermore National Laboratory in California. In 1979, he received an honorary Doctor of Science from the University of Missouri.

== Early career ==
During World War II, before he received his bachelor's degree, Foster began his career in the Radio Research Laboratory at Harvard University. He was an advisor to the 15th Air Force on radar and radar countermeasures in the Mediterranean Theater of Operations in 1943 and 1944. In the summers of 1946 and 1947, he worked on the Canadian nuclear power project in Chalk River, Ontario.

== Lawrence Livermore Laboratory ==
In 1952, Foster was recruited to Lawrence Livermore Laboratory by its founder Edward Teller, and became a division leader in experimental physics. He was promoted to associate director in 1958, and director of the Livermore Laboratory and associate director of the Lawrence Berkeley National Laboratory in 1961, in which positions he served until 1965.

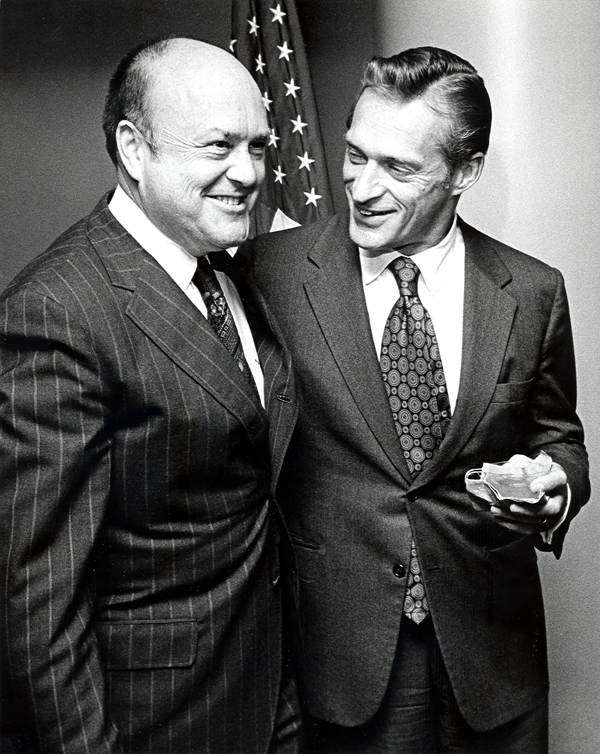
Foster with Secretary of Defense Melvin Laird, 1972

== Department of Defense ==
Foster was appointed director of defense research and engineering, a position then considered the number-three job in the Department of Defense, by Secretary of Defense Robert S. McNamara in October 1965. He continued in this position until June 1973, serving under Presidents Lyndon B. Johnson and Richard Nixon, and under Secretaries of Defense McNamara, Clark Clifford, Melvin Laird, and Elliot Richardson.

== Later career ==
From 1973, Foster was vice president, science and technology of TRW, retiring in 1988. He continued to serve on the board of directors of TRW from 1988 to 1994. He was a Consultant to Northrop Grumman, Ninesigma, Wackenhut Services, Inc., and Defense Group, Inc. He was also chairman of the Board of Pilkington Aerospace, Inc., and Chairman of Technology Strategies and Alliances.

From 1973 until 1990, he was a member of the President's Foreign Intelligence Advisory Board. He was a long-serving member of the Defense Science Board, of which he served as chairman from January 1990 to June 1993.

== Later life and death ==
Foster turned 100 on September 18, 2022. He continued to advise and mentor scientists at Livermore into the 2020s. He died from heart failure in Santa Barbara, California, on April 25, 2025, at the age of 102.

== Public positions ==
Foster's public positions have consistently reflected his support of a robust U.S. nuclear stockpile.

During the George W. Bush administration, Foster was a prominent advocate for a return to nuclear testing and for the design of a new generation of U.S. nuclear weapons. He chaired the "Panel to Assess the Reliability, Safety, and Security of the United States Nuclear Stockpile," created in 1998 by Republican Sen. Jon Kyl of Arizona, a longtime foe of the Comprehensive Test Ban Treaty. The panel, popularly known as the "Foster Panel", issued several reports advocating increased weapons spending.

Foster was a prominent member of the commission to Assess the Threat to the United States from Electromagnetic Pulse (EMP) Attack, established by the 2001 Defense Authorization Act. The commission's report called for strong defensive measures across a wide range of industries and public services.

== Honors and awards ==
Foster received the Founder's Award from the National Academy of Engineering in 1989, and the Enrico Fermi Award in 1992. His other awards include the Ernest Orlando Lawrence Award of the Atomic Energy Commission (1960), the Defense Department's Distinguished Public Service Medals (1969, 1973, 1993), election to the National Academy of Engineering (1969), the James Forrestal Memorial Award (1969), the H.H. Arnold Trophy (1971), the Crowell Medal (1972), the WEMA Award (1973), and the Knight Commander's Cross (Badge and Star) of the Order of Merit of the Federal Republic of Germany (1974). Foster was a commander, Legion of Honor, Republic of France.
