= Moving magnet and conductor problem =

Thought experiment in physics

Conductor moving in a magnetic field.

The moving magnet and conductor problem is a famous thought experiment, originating in the 19th century, concerning the intersection of classical electromagnetism and special relativity. In it, the current in a conductor moving with constant velocity, v, with respect to a magnet is calculated in the frame of reference of the magnet and in the frame of reference of the conductor. The observable quantity in the experiment, the current, is the same in either case, in accordance with the basic principle of relativity, which states: "Only relative motion is observable; there is no absolute standard of rest". However, according to Maxwell's equations, the charges in the conductor experience a magnetic force in the frame of the magnet and an electric force in the frame of the conductor. The same phenomenon would seem to have two different descriptions depending on the frame of reference of the observer.

This problem, along with the Fizeau experiment, the aberration of light, and more indirectly the negative aether drift tests such as the Michelson–Morley experiment, formed the basis of Einstein's development of the theory of relativity.

== Introduction ==
Einstein's 1905 paper that introduced the world to relativity opens with a description of the magnet/conductor problem:

It is known that Maxwell's electrodynamics – as usually understood at the present time – when applied to moving bodies, leads to asymmetries which do not appear to be inherent in the phenomena. Take, for example, the reciprocal electrodynamic action of a magnet and a conductor. The observable phenomenon here depends only on the relative motion of the conductor and the magnet, whereas the customary view draws a sharp distinction between the two cases in which either the one or the other of these bodies is in motion. For if the magnet is in motion and the conductor at rest, there arises in the neighborhood of the magnet an electric field with a certain definite energy, producing a current at the places where parts of the conductor are situated. But if the magnet is stationary and the conductor in motion, no electric field arises in the neighborhood of the magnet. In the conductor, however, we find an electromotive force, to which in itself there is no corresponding energy, but which gives rise – assuming equality of relative motion in the two cases discussed – to electric currents of the same path and intensity as those produced by the electric forces in the former case.

— A. Einstein, On the electrodynamics of moving bodies (1905)

An overriding requirement on the descriptions in different frameworks is that they be consistent. Consistency is an issue because Newtonian mechanics predicts one transformation (so-called Galilean invariance) for the forces that drive the charges and cause the current, while electrodynamics as expressed by Maxwell's equations predicts that the fields that give rise to these forces transform differently (according to Lorentz invariance). Observations of the aberration of light, culminating in the Michelson–Morley experiment, established the validity of Lorentz invariance, and the development of special relativity resolved the resulting disagreement with Newtonian mechanics. Special relativity revised the transformation of forces in moving reference frames to be consistent with Lorentz invariance. The details of these transformations are discussed below.

In addition to consistency, it would be nice to consolidate the descriptions so they appear to be frame-independent. A clue to a framework-independent description is the observation that magnetic fields in one reference frame become electric fields in another frame. Likewise, the solenoidal portion of electric fields (the portion that is not originated by electric charges) becomes a magnetic field in another frame: that is, the solenoidal electric fields and magnetic fields are aspects of the same thing. That means the paradox of different descriptions may be only semantic. A description that uses scalar and vector potentials φ and A instead of B and E avoids the semantical trap. A Lorentz-invariant four vector A^{α} = (φ / c, A) replaces E and B and provides a frame-independent description (albeit less visceral than the E– B–description). An alternative unification of descriptions is to think of the physical entity as the electromagnetic field tensor, as described later on. This tensor contains both E and B fields as components, and has the same form in all frames of reference.

== Background ==
Electromagnetic fields are not directly observable. The existence of classical electromagnetic fields can be inferred from the motion of charged particles, whose trajectories are observable. Electromagnetic fields do explain the observed motions of classical charged particles.

A strong requirement in physics is that all observers of the motion of a particle agree on the trajectory of the particle. For instance, if one observer notes that a particle collides with the center of a bullseye, then all observers must reach the same conclusion. This requirement places constraints on the nature of electromagnetic fields and on their transformation from one reference frame to another. It also places constraints on the manner in which fields affect the acceleration and, hence, the trajectories of charged particles.

Perhaps the simplest example, and one that Einstein referenced in his 1905 paper introducing special relativity, is the problem of a conductor moving relative to a magnet. In the frame of the magnet, the conductor experiences a force due to a magnetic field. In the frame of the conductor, however, the conductor experiences a force due to an electric field. The magnetic field in the magnet frame and the electric field in the conductor frame must generate consistent results in the conductor. At the time of Einstein in 1905, the field equations as represented by Maxwell's equations were properly consistent. Newton's law of motion, however, had to be modified to provide consistent particle trajectories.

== Transformation of fields, assuming Galilean transformations ==
Assuming that the magnet frame and the conductor frame are related by a Galilean transformation, it is straightforward to compute the fields and forces in both frames. This will demonstrate that the induced current is indeed the same in both frames. As a byproduct, this argument will also yield a general formula for the electric and magnetic fields in one frame in terms of the fields in another frame.

In reality, the frames are not related by a Galilean transformation, but by a Lorentz transformation. Nevertheless, it will be a Galilean transformation to a very good approximation, at velocities much less than the speed of light.

Unprimed quantities correspond to the rest frame of the magnet, while primed quantities correspond to the rest frame of the conductor. Let v be the velocity of the conductor, as seen from the magnet frame.

=== Magnet frame ===
In the rest frame of the magnet, the magnetic field is some fixed field B(r), determined by the structure and shape of the magnet. The electric field is zero.

In general, the force exerted upon a particle of charge q in the conductor by the electric field and magnetic field is given by (SI units):
$$\mathbf{F} = q \left(\mathbf{E} + \mathbf{v} \times \mathbf{B}\right),$$
where $q$ is the charge on the particle, $\mathbf{v}$ is the particle velocity and F is the Lorentz force. Here, however, the electric field is zero, so the force on the particle is
$$\mathbf{F} = q  \mathbf{v} \times \mathbf{B}.$$

=== Conductor frame ===
In the conductor frame, there is a time-varying magnetic field B′ related to the magnetic field B in the magnet frame according to:
$$\mathbf{B}'(\mathbf{r'},t') = \mathbf{B}(\mathbf{r_{t'}})$$
where $\mathbf{r_{t'}} = \mathbf{r'} + \mathbf{v}t'$

In this frame, there is an electric field, and its curl is given by the Maxwell-Faraday equation:
$$\boldsymbol{\nabla} \times \mathbf{E}' = -\frac{\partial \mathbf{B}'}{\partial t'}.$$

This yields:
$$\mathbf{E}' = \mathbf{v}\times \mathbf{B}.$$

Explanation of this equation for $\mathbf{E}'$.

To make this explicable: if a conductor moves through a B-field with a gradient $\partial B_z/\partial z$, along the z-axis with constant velocity $v_z = \partial z/\partial t$, it follows that in the frame of the conductor
$$\frac{\partial B'_z}{\partial t} = v_z \frac{\partial B_z}{\partial z} = -(\nabla \times \mathbf{E'})_z = \frac{\partial E'_x}{\partial y} - \frac{\partial E'_y}{\partial x}.$$
It can be seen that this equation is consistent with
$$\mathbf{E'} = \mathbf{v}\times \mathbf{B} = v_z B_x \hat{y} - v_z B_y \hat{x},$$
by determining $\partial E'_x/\partial y$ and $\partial E_y'/\partial x$ from this expression and substituting it in the first expression while using that
$$\nabla \cdot \mathbf{B} = \frac{\partial B_x}{\partial x} + \frac{\partial B_y}{\partial y} + \frac{\partial B_z}{\partial z} = 0.$$
Even in the limit of infinitesimal small gradients $\partial B_z/\partial z$ these relations hold, and therefore the Lorentz force equation is also valid if the magnetic field in the conductor frame is not varying in time. At relativistic velocities a correction factor is needed, see below and Classical electromagnetism and special relativity and Lorentz transformation.

A charge q in the conductor will be at rest in the conductor frame. Therefore, the magnetic force term of the Lorentz force has no effect, and the force on the charge is given by
$$\mathbf{F}' = q\mathbf{E}' = q\mathbf{v} \times \mathbf{B}.$$

This demonstrates that the force is the same in both frames (as would be expected), and therefore any observable consequences of this force, such as the induced current, would also be the same in both frames. This is despite the fact that the force is seen to be an electric force in the conductor frame, but a magnetic force in the magnet's frame.

=== Galilean transformation formula for fields ===
A similar sort of argument can be made if the magnet's frame also contains electric fields. (The Ampere-Maxwell equation also comes into play, explaining how, in the conductor's frame, this moving electric field will contribute to the magnetic field.) The result is that, in general,
$$\begin{align}
\mathbf{E}' &= \mathbf{E} + \mathbf{v}\times \mathbf{B} \\[1ex]
\mathbf{B}' &= \mathbf{B} - \frac{1}{c^2} \mathbf{v} \times \mathbf{E},
\end{align}$$
with c the speed of light in free space.

By plugging these transformation rules into the full Maxwell's equations, it can be seen that if Maxwell's equations are true in one frame, then they are almost true in the other, but contain incorrect terms proportional to the quantity v/c raised to the second or higher power. Accordingly, these are not the exact transformation rules, but are a close approximation at low velocities. At large velocities approaching the speed of light, the Galilean transformation must be replaced by the Lorentz transformation, and the field transformation equations also must be changed, according to the expressions given below.

== Transformation of fields as predicted by Maxwell's equations ==
In a frame moving at velocity v, the E-field in the moving frame when there is no E-field in the stationary magnet frame Maxwell's equations transform as:
$$\mathbf{E}' = \gamma \mathbf{v} \times  \mathbf{B}$$
where
$$\gamma = \frac{1}{\sqrt{1 - {(v/c)}^2}}$$
is called the Lorentz factor and c is the speed of light in free space. This result is a consequence of requiring that observers in all inertial frames arrive at the same form for Maxwell's equations. In particular, all observers must see the same speed of light c. That requirement leads to the Lorentz transformation for space and time. Assuming a Lorentz transformation, invariance of Maxwell's equations then leads to the above transformation of the fields for this example.

Consequently, the force on the charge is
$$\mathbf{F}' = q \mathbf{E}' =  q \gamma \mathbf{v} \times  \mathbf{B}.$$

This expression differs from the expression obtained from the nonrelativistic Newton's law of motion by a factor of $\gamma$. Special relativity modifies space and time in a manner such that the forces and fields transform consistently.

== Modification of dynamics for consistency with Maxwell's equations ==
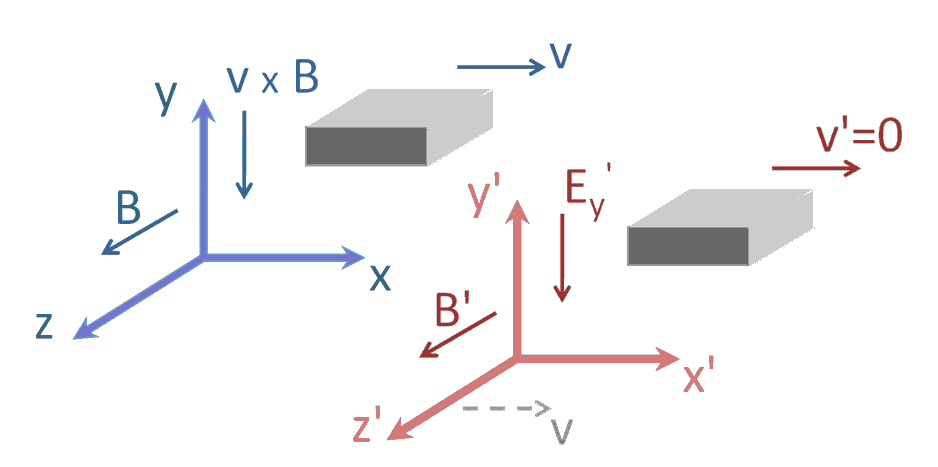
Figure 1: Conducting bar seen from two inertial frames; in one frame the bar moves with velocity v; in the primed frame the bar is stationary because the primed frame moves at the same velocity as the bar. The B-field varies with position in the x-direction

The Lorentz force has the same form in both frames, though the fields differ, namely:
$$\mathbf{F} = q \left[\mathbf{E} + \mathbf{v} \times \mathbf{B} \right].$$

See Figure 1. To simplify, let the magnetic field point in the z-direction and vary with location x, and let the conductor translate in the positive x-direction with velocity v. Consequently, in the magnet frame where the conductor is moving, the Lorentz force points in the negative y-direction, perpendicular to both the velocity, and the B-field. The force on a charge, here due only to the B-field, is
$$F_y = -qvB,$$
while in the conductor frame where the magnet is moving, the force is also in the negative y-direction, and now due only to the E-field with a value:
$${F_y}' = qE' = -q\gamma vB.$$

The two forces differ by the Lorentz factor γ. This difference is expected in a relativistic theory, however, due to the change in space-time between frames, as discussed next.

Relativity takes the Lorentz transformation of space-time suggested by invariance of Maxwell's equations and imposes it upon dynamics as well (a revision of Newton's laws of motion). In this example, the Lorentz transformation affects the x-direction only (the relative motion of the two frames is along the x-direction). The relations connecting time and space are ( primes denote the moving conductor frame ) :
$$\begin{align}
x' &= \gamma \left(x - vt\right), &
x  &= \gamma\left(x' + vt'\right), \\[1ex]
t' &= \gamma \left(t - \tfrac{vx}{c^2}\right), &
t  &= \gamma\left(t' + \tfrac{vx'}{c^2}\right).
\end{align}$$

These transformations lead to a change in the y-component of a force:
$${F_y}' = \gamma F_y.$$

That is, within Lorentz invariance, force is not the same in all frames of reference, unlike Galilean invariance. But, from the earlier analysis based upon the Lorentz force law:
$$\gamma F_y = -q\gamma vB, \quad {F_y}' = -q\gamma v B,$$
which agrees completely. So the force on the charge is not the same in both frames, but it transforms as expected according to relativity.

== See also ==
- Annus Mirabilis Papers
- Darwin Lagrangian
- Eddy current
- Electric motor
- Einstein's thought experiments
- Faraday's law
- Faraday paradox
- Galilean invariance
- Inertial frame
- Lenz's law
- Lorentz transformation
- Principle of relativity
- Relativistic electromagnetism
- Special theory of relativity
- Paradox of radiation of charged particles in a gravitational field
