= Mathematical descriptions of the electromagnetic field =

Formulations of electromagnetism

There are various mathematical descriptions of the electromagnetic field that are used in the study of electromagnetism, one of the four fundamental interactions of nature. In this article, several approaches are discussed, although the equations are in terms of electric and magnetic fields, potentials, and charges with currents, generally speaking.

== Vector-field approach ==
The most common description of the electromagnetic field uses two three-dimensional vector fields called the electric field and the magnetic field. These vector fields each have a value defined at every point of space and time and are thus often regarded as functions of the space and time coordinates. As such, they are often written as E(x, y, z, t) (electric field) and B(x, y, z, t) (magnetic field).

If only the electric field (E) is non-zero, and is constant in time, the field is said to be an electrostatic field. Similarly, if only the magnetic field (B) is non-zero and is constant in time, the field is said to be a magnetostatic field. However, if either the electric or magnetic field has a time-dependence, then both fields must be considered together as a coupled electromagnetic field using Maxwell's equations.

=== Maxwell's equations in the vector-field approach ===
The behaviour of electric and magnetic fields, whether in cases of electrostatics, magnetostatics, or electrodynamics (electromagnetic fields), is governed by Maxwell–Heaviside's equations:

Maxwell's equations (vector fields)
$\nabla \cdot \mathbf{E} = \frac{\rho}{\varepsilon_0}$	Gauss's law
$\nabla \cdot \mathbf{B} = 0$	Gauss's law for magnetism
$\nabla \times \mathbf{E} = -\frac {\partial \mathbf{B}}{\partial t}$	Faraday's law of induction
$\nabla \times \mathbf{B} = \mu_0 \mathbf{J} + \mu_0\varepsilon_0 \frac{\partial \mathbf{E}}{\partial t}$	Ampère–Maxwell law

where ρ is the charge density, which can (and often does) depend on time and position, ε_{0} is the electric constant, μ_{0} is the magnetic constant, and J is the current per unit area, also a function of time and position. The equations take this form with the International System of Quantities.

When dealing with only nondispersive isotropic linear materials, Maxwell's equations are often modified to ignore bound charges by replacing the permeability and permittivity of free space with the permeability and permittivity of the linear material in question. For some materials that have more complex responses to electromagnetic fields, these properties can be represented by tensors, with time-dependence related to the material's ability to respond to rapid field changes (dispersion (optics), Green–Kubo relations), and possibly also field dependencies representing nonlinear and/or nonlocal material responses to large amplitude fields (nonlinear optics).

== Potential-field approach ==
Many times in the use and calculation of electric and magnetic fields, the approach used first computes an associated potential: the electric potential, $\varphi$, for the electric field, and the magnetic vector potential, A, for the magnetic field. The electric potential is a scalar field, while the magnetic potential is a vector field. This is why sometimes the electric potential is called the scalar potential and the magnetic potential is called the vector potential. These potentials can be used to find their associated fields as follows:
$$\mathbf E = - \mathbf \nabla \varphi - \frac{\partial \mathbf A}{\partial t}$$
$$\mathbf B = \mathbf \nabla \times \mathbf A$$

=== Maxwell's equations in potential formulation ===
These relations can be substituted into Maxwell's equations to express the latter in terms of the potentials. Faraday's law and Gauss's law for magnetism (the homogeneous equations) turn out to be identically true for any potentials. This is because of the way the fields are expressed as gradients and curls of the scalar and vector potentials. The homogeneous equations in terms of these potentials involve the divergence of the curl $\nabla \cdot \nabla \times \mathbf A$ and the curl of the gradient $\nabla \times \nabla \varphi$, which are always zero. The other two of Maxwell's equations (the inhomogeneous equations) are the ones that describe the dynamics in the potential formulation.

Maxwell's equations (potential formulation)

$\nabla^2 \varphi + \frac{\partial}{\partial t} \left ( \mathbf \nabla \cdot \mathbf A \right ) = - \frac{\rho}{\varepsilon_0}$

$\left ( \nabla^2 \mathbf A - \frac{1}{c^2} \frac{\partial^2 \mathbf A}{\partial t^2} \right ) - \mathbf \nabla \left ( \mathbf \nabla \cdot \mathbf A + \frac{1}{c^2} \frac{\partial \varphi}{\partial t} \right ) = - \mu_0 \mathbf J$

These equations taken together are as powerful and complete as Maxwell's equations. Moreover, the problem has been reduced somewhat, as the electric and magnetic fields together had six components to solve for. In the potential formulation, there are only four components: the electric potential and the three components of the vector potential. However, the equations are messier than Maxwell's equations using the electric and magnetic fields.

=== Gauge freedom ===
These equations can be simplified by taking advantage of the fact that the electric and magnetic fields are physically meaningful quantities that can be measured; the potentials are not. There is a freedom to constrain the form of the potentials provided that this does not affect the resultant electric and magnetic fields, called gauge freedom. Specifically for these equations, for any choice of a twice-differentiable scalar function of position and time λ, if (φ, A) is a solution for a given system, then so is another potential (φ′, A′) given by:
$$\varphi' = \varphi - \frac{\partial \lambda}{\partial t}$$
$$\mathbf A' = \mathbf A + \mathbf \nabla \lambda$$

This freedom can be used to simplify the potential formulation. Either of two such scalar functions is typically chosen: the Coulomb gauge and the Lorenz gauge.

==== Coulomb gauge ====
The Coulomb gauge is chosen in such a way that $\mathbf \nabla \cdot \mathbf A' = 0$, which corresponds to the case of magnetostatics. In terms of λ, this means that it must satisfy the equation
$$\nabla^2 \lambda = - \mathbf \nabla \cdot \mathbf A.$$

This choice of function results in the following formulation of Maxwell's equations:
$$\nabla^2 \varphi' = -\frac{\rho}{\varepsilon_0}$$
$$\nabla^2 \mathbf A' - \mu_0 \varepsilon_0 \frac{\partial^2\! \mathbf A'}{\partial t^2} = - \mu_0 \mathbf J + \mu_0 \varepsilon_0 \nabla\!\! \left (\! \frac{\partial \varphi'}{\partial t} \!\right )$$

Several features about Maxwell's equations in the Coulomb gauge are as follows. Firstly, solving for the electric potential is very easy, as the equation is a version of Poisson's equation. Secondly, solving for the magnetic vector potential is particularly difficult. This is the big disadvantage of this gauge. The third thing to note, and something that is not immediately obvious, is that the electric potential changes instantly everywhere in response to a change in conditions in one locality.

For instance, if a charge is moved in New York at 1 pm local time, then a hypothetical observer in Australia who could measure the electric potential directly would measure a change in the potential at 1 pm New York time. This seemingly violates causality in special relativity, i.e. the impossibility of information, signals, or anything travelling faster than the speed of light. The resolution to this apparent problem lies in the fact that, as previously stated, no observers can measure the potentials; they measure the electric and magnetic fields. So, the combination of ∇φ and ∂A/∂t used in determining the electric field restores the speed limit imposed by special relativity for the electric field, making all observable quantities consistent with relativity.

==== Lorenz gauge condition ====
A gauge that is often used is the Lorenz gauge condition. In this, the scalar function λ is chosen such that
$$\mathbf \nabla \cdot \mathbf A' = - \mu_0 \varepsilon_0 \frac{\partial \varphi'}{\partial t} ,$$
meaning that λ must satisfy the equation
$$\nabla^2 \lambda - \mu_0 \varepsilon_0 \frac{\partial^2 \lambda }{\partial t^2}= - \mathbf \nabla \cdot \mathbf A - \mu_0 \varepsilon_0 \frac{\partial \varphi}{\partial t} .$$

The Lorenz gauge results in the following form of Maxwell's equations:
$$\nabla^2 \varphi' - \mu_0 \varepsilon_0 \frac{\partial^2 \varphi'}{\partial t^2} = -\Box^2 \varphi' = - \frac{\rho}{\varepsilon_0}$$
$$\nabla^2 \mathbf A' - \mu_0 \varepsilon_0 \frac{\partial^2 \mathbf A'}{\partial t^2} = -\Box^2 \mathbf A' = - \mu_0 \mathbf J$$

The operator $\Box^2$ is called the d'Alembertian (some authors denote this by only the square $\Box$). These equations are inhomogeneous versions of the wave equation, with the terms on the right side of the equation serving as the source functions for the wave. As with any wave equation, these equations lead to two types of solution: advanced potentials (which are related to the configuration of the sources at future points in time), and retarded potentials (which are related to the past configurations of the sources); the former are usually disregarded where the field is to analyzed from a causality perspective.

As pointed out above, the Lorenz gauge is no more valid than any other gauge since the potentials cannot be directly measured, however the Lorenz gauge has the advantage of the equations being Lorentz invariant.

=== Extension to quantum electrodynamics ===
Canonical quantization of the electromagnetic fields proceeds by elevating the scalar and vector potentials; φ(x), A(x), from fields to field operators. Substituting 1/c^{2} = ε_{0}μ_{0} into the previous Lorenz gauge equations gives:

$$\nabla^2 \mathbf A - \frac 1 {c^2} \frac{\partial^2 \mathbf A}{\partial t^2} = - \mu_0 \mathbf J$$
$$\nabla^2 \varphi - \frac 1 {c^2} \frac{\partial^2 \varphi}{\partial t^2} = - \frac{\rho}{\varepsilon_0}$$

Here, J and ρ are the current and charge density of the matter field. If the matter field is taken so as to describe the interaction of electromagnetic fields with the Dirac electron given by the four-component Dirac spinor field ψ, the current and charge densities have form:
$$\mathbf{J}=-e\psi^{\dagger}\boldsymbol{\alpha}\psi\,\quad \rho=-e\psi^{\dagger}\psi \,,$$
where α are the first three Dirac matrices. Using this, we can re-write Maxwell's equations as:

Maxwell's equations (QED)

$\nabla^2 \mathbf A - \frac 1 {c^2} \frac{\partial^2 \mathbf A}{\partial t^2} = \mu_0 e \psi^{\dagger} \boldsymbol{\alpha} \psi$

$\nabla^2 \varphi - \frac 1 {c^2} \frac{\partial^2 \varphi}{\partial t^2} = \frac{1}{\varepsilon_0} e \psi^{\dagger} \psi$

which is the form used in quantum electrodynamics.

== Geometric algebra formulations ==
Analogous to the tensor formulation, two objects, one for the electromagnetic field and one for the current density, are introduced. In geometric algebra (GA) these are multivectors, which sometimes follow Ricci calculus.

=== Algebra of physical space ===
In the Algebra of physical space (APS), also known as the Clifford algebra $C\ell_{3,0}(\R)$, the field and current are represented by multivectors.

The field multivector, known as the Riemann–Silberstein vector, is
$$\mathbf{F} = \mathbf{E} + Ic\mathbf{B} = E^k\sigma_k + IcB^k\sigma_k ,$$
and the four-current multivector is
$$c \rho - \mathbf{J} = c \rho - J^k\sigma_k$$
using an orthonormal basis $\{\sigma_k\}$. Similarly, the unit pseudoscalar is $I=\sigma_1\sigma_2\sigma_3$, due to the fact that the basis used is orthonormal. These basis vectors share the algebra of the Pauli matrices, but are usually not equated with them, as they are different objects with different interpretations.

After defining the derivative
$$\boldsymbol{\nabla} = \sigma^k \partial_k,$$

Maxwell's equations are reduced to the single equation

Maxwell's equations (APS formulation)

$\left(\frac{1}{c}\dfrac{\partial }{\partial t} + \boldsymbol{\nabla}\right)\mathbf{F} = \mu_0 c (c \rho - \mathbf{J}).$

In three dimensions, the derivative has a special structure allowing the introduction of a cross product:
$$\boldsymbol{\nabla}\mathbf{F} = \boldsymbol{\nabla} \cdot \mathbf{F} + \boldsymbol{\nabla} \wedge \mathbf{F} = \boldsymbol{\nabla} \cdot \mathbf{F} + I \boldsymbol{\nabla} \times \mathbf{F}$$
from which it is easily seen that Gauss's law is the scalar part, the Ampère–Maxwell law is the vector part, Faraday's law is the pseudovector part, and Gauss's law for magnetism is the pseudoscalar part of the equation. After expanding and rearranging, this can be written as
$$\left( \boldsymbol{\nabla} \cdot \mathbf{E} - \frac{\rho}{\varepsilon_0} \right)- c \left( \boldsymbol{\nabla} \times \mathbf{B} - \mu_0 \varepsilon_0 \frac{\partial {\mathbf{E}}}{\partial {t}} - \mu_0 \mathbf{J} \right)+ I \left( \boldsymbol{\nabla} \times \mathbf{E} + \frac{\partial {\mathbf{B}}}{\partial {t}} \right)+ I c \left( \boldsymbol{\nabla} \cdot \mathbf{B} \right)= 0$$

=== Spacetime algebra ===
We can identify APS as a subalgebra of the spacetime algebra (STA) $C\ell_{1,3}(\mathbb{R})$, defining $\sigma_k=\gamma_k\gamma_0$ and $I=\gamma_0\gamma_1\gamma_2\gamma_3$. The $\gamma_\mu$s have the same algebraic properties of the gamma matrices but their matrix representation is not needed. The derivative is now
$$\nabla = \gamma^\mu \partial_\mu.$$

The Riemann–Silberstein becomes a bivector
$$F = \mathbf{E} + Ic\mathbf{B} = E^1\gamma_1\gamma_0 + E^2\gamma_2\gamma_0 + E^3\gamma_3\gamma_0 -c(B^1\gamma_2\gamma_3 + B^2\gamma_3\gamma_1 + B^3\gamma_1\gamma_2),$$
and the charge and current density become a vector
$$J = J^\mu \gamma_\mu = c \rho \gamma_0 + J^k \gamma_k = \gamma_0(c \rho - J^k \sigma_k).$$

Owing to the identity
$$\gamma_0 \nabla = \gamma_0\gamma^0 \partial_0 + \gamma_0\gamma^k\partial_k = \partial_0 + \sigma^k\partial_k = \frac{1}{c}\dfrac{\partial }{\partial t} + \boldsymbol{\nabla},$$

Maxwell's equations reduce to the single equation

Maxwell's equations (STA formulation)

$\nabla F = \mu_0 c J.$

== Differential-forms approach ==
In what follows, cgs-Gaussian units, not SI units are used. (To convert to SI, see here.) By Einstein notation, we implicitly take the sum over all values of the indices that can vary within the dimension.

=== Field 2-form ===
In free space, where ε = ε_{0} and μ = μ_{0} are constant everywhere, Maxwell's equations simplify considerably once the language of differential geometry and differential forms is used. The electric and magnetic fields are now jointly described by a 2-form F in a 4-dimensional spacetime manifold. The Faraday tensor $F_{\mu\nu}$ (electromagnetic tensor) can be written as a 2-form in Minkowski space with metric signature (− + + +) as
$$\begin{align}
\mathbf{F} & \equiv \frac{1}{2}F_{\mu\nu} \mathrm{d}x^{\mu} \wedge \mathrm{d}x^{\nu} \\
& = B_x \mathrm{d}y \wedge \mathrm{d}z + B_y \mathrm{d}z \wedge \mathrm{d}x + B_z \mathrm{d}x \wedge \mathrm{d}y + E_x \mathrm{d}x \wedge \mathrm{d}t + E_y \mathrm{d}y \wedge \mathrm{d}t + E_z \mathrm{d}z \wedge \mathrm{d}t
\end{align}$$
which is the exterior derivative of the electromagnetic four-potential $\mathbf{A} :$
$$\mathbf{A} = - \phi\, \mathrm{d}t + A_x \mathrm{d}x + A_y \mathrm{d}y + A_z \mathrm{d}z .$$

The source free equations can be written by the action of the exterior derivative on this 2-form. But for the equations with source terms (Gauss's law and the Ampère–Maxwell equation), the Hodge dual of this 2-form is needed. The Hodge star operator takes a p-form to a (n − p)-form, where n is the number of dimensions. Here, it takes the 2-form (F) and gives another 2-form (in four dimensions, n − p = 4 − 2 = 2). For the basis cotangent vectors, the Hodge dual is given as (see Hodge star operator § Four dimensions)
$${\star} ( \mathrm{d}x \wedge \mathrm{d}y ) = - \mathrm{d}z \wedge \mathrm{d}t ,\quad {\star} ( \mathrm{d}x \wedge \mathrm{d}t ) = \mathrm{d}y \wedge \mathrm{d}z,$$
and so on. Using these relations, the dual of the Faraday 2-form is the Maxwell tensor,
$${\star} \mathbf{F} = - B_x \mathrm{d}x \wedge \mathrm{d}t - B_y \mathrm{d}y \wedge \mathrm{d}t - B_z \mathrm{d}z \wedge \mathrm{d}t + E_x \mathrm{d}y \wedge \mathrm{d}z + E_y \mathrm{d}z \wedge \mathrm{d}x + E_z \mathrm{d}x \wedge \mathrm{d}y$$

=== Current 3-form, dual current 1-form ===
Here, the 3-form J is called the electric current form or current 3-form:
$$\mathbf{J} = \rho\, \mathrm{d}x \wedge \mathrm{d}y \wedge \mathrm{d}z - j_x \mathrm{d}t \wedge \mathrm{d}y \wedge \mathrm{d}z - j_y \mathrm{d}t \wedge \mathrm{d}z \wedge \mathrm{d}x - j_z \mathrm{d}t \wedge \mathrm{d}x \wedge \mathrm{d}y .$$

That F is a closed form, and the exterior derivative of its Hodge dual is the current 3-form, express Maxwell's equations:

Maxwell's equations

$\mathrm{d}\mathbf{F}=0$

$\mathrm{d}{\star}\mathbf{F}=\mathbf{J}$

Here d denotes the exterior derivative – a natural coordinate- and metric-independent differential operator acting on forms, and the (dual) Hodge star operator ${\star}$ is a linear transformation from the space of 2-forms to the space of (4 − 2)-forms defined by the metric in Minkowski space (in four dimensions even by any metric conformal to this metric). The fields are in natural units where 1/(4πε_{0}) = 1.

Since d^{2} = 0, the 3-form J satisfies the conservation of current (continuity equation):
$$\mathrm{d}{\mathbf{J}}=\mathrm{d}^2{\star}\mathbf{F}=0.$$
The current 3-form can be integrated over a 3-dimensional space-time region. The physical interpretation of this integral is the charge in that region if it is spacelike, or the amount of charge that flows through a surface in a certain amount of time if that region is a spacelike surface cross a timelike interval. As the exterior derivative is defined on any manifold, the differential form version of the Bianchi identity makes sense for any 4-dimensional manifold, whereas the source equation is defined if the manifold is oriented and has a Lorentz metric. In particular the differential form version of the Maxwell equations are a convenient and intuitive formulation of the Maxwell equations in general relativity.

Note: In much of the literature, the notations $\mathbf{J}$ and ${\star}\mathbf{J}$ are switched, so that $\mathbf{J}$ is a 1-form called the current and ${\star}\mathbf{J}$ is a 3-form called the dual current.

==== Linear macroscopic influence of matter ====
In a linear, macroscopic theory, the influence of matter on the electromagnetic field is described through more general linear transformation in the space of 2-forms. We call
$$C:\Lambda^2\ni\mathbf{F}\mapsto \mathbf{G}\in\Lambda^{(4-2)}$$
the constitutive transformation. The role of this transformation is comparable to the Hodge duality transformation. The Maxwell equations in the presence of matter then become:
$$\mathrm{d}\mathbf{F} = 0$$
$$\mathrm{d}\mathbf{G} = \mathbf{J}$$
where the current 3-form J still satisfies the continuity equation dJ = 0.

When the fields are expressed as linear combinations (of exterior products) of basis forms θ^{i},
$$\mathbf{F} = \frac{1}{2}F_{pq}\mathbf{\theta}^p\wedge\mathbf{\theta}^q.$$
the constitutive relation takes the form
$$G_{pq} = C_{pq}^{mn}F_{mn}$$
where the field coefficient functions and the constitutive coefficients are anticommutative for swapping of each one's indices. In particular, the Hodge star operator that was used in the above case is obtained by taking
$$C_{pq}^{mn} = \frac{1}{2}g^{ma}g^{nb} \varepsilon_{abpq} \sqrt{-g}$$
in terms of tensor index notation with respect to a (not necessarily orthonormal) basis $\left\{\frac{\partial}{\partial x_1}, \ldots, \frac{\partial}{\partial x_n}\right\}$ in a tangent space $V = T_p M$ and its dual basis $\{dx_1,\ldots,dx_n\}$ in $V^* = T^*_p M$, having the gram metric matrix $(g_{ij}) = \left(\left\langle \frac{\partial}{\partial x_i}, \frac{\partial}{\partial x_j}\right\rangle\right)$ and its inverse matrix $(g^{ij}) = (\langle dx^i, dx^j\rangle)$, and $\varepsilon_{abpq}$ is the Levi-Civita symbol with $\varepsilon_{1234} = 1$. Up to scaling, this is the only invariant tensor of this type that can be defined with the metric.

In this formulation, electromagnetism generalises immediately to any 4-dimensional oriented manifold or with small adaptations any manifold.

=== Alternative metric signature ===
In the particle physicist's sign convention for the metric signature (+ − − −), the potential 1-form is
$$\mathbf{A} = \phi\, \mathrm{d}t - A_x \mathrm{d}x - A_y \mathrm{d}y - A_z \mathrm{d}z .$$

The Faraday curvature 2-form becomes
$$\begin{align}
\mathbf{F} \equiv & \frac{1}{2}F_{\mu\nu} \mathrm{d}x^{\mu} \wedge \mathrm{d}x^{\nu} \\
= & E_x \mathrm{d}t \wedge \mathrm{d}x + E_y \mathrm{d}t \wedge \mathrm{d}y + E_z \mathrm{d}t \wedge \mathrm{d}z - B_x \mathrm{d}y \wedge \mathrm{d}z - B_y \mathrm{d}z \wedge \mathrm{d}x - B_z \mathrm{d}x \wedge \mathrm{d}y
\end{align}$$
and the Maxwell tensor becomes
$${{\star} \mathbf{F}} = - E_x \mathrm{d}y \wedge \mathrm{d}z - E_y \mathrm{d}z \wedge \mathrm{d}x - E_z \mathrm{d}x \wedge \mathrm{d}y - B_x \mathrm{d}t \wedge \mathrm{d}x - B_y \mathrm{d}t \wedge \mathrm{d}y - B_z \mathrm{d}t \wedge \mathrm{d}z.$$

The current 3-form J is
$$\mathbf{J} = - \rho\, \mathrm{d}x \wedge \mathrm{d}y \wedge \mathrm{d}z + j_x \mathrm{d}t \wedge \mathrm{d}y \wedge \mathrm{d}z + j_y \mathrm{d}t \wedge \mathrm{d}z \wedge \mathrm{d}x + j_z \mathrm{d}t \wedge \mathrm{d}x \wedge \mathrm{d}y$$
and the corresponding dual 1-form is
$${{\star}\mathbf{J}} = -\rho\, \mathrm{d}t + j_x \mathrm{d}x + j_y \mathrm{d}y + j_z \mathrm{d}z .$$

The current norm is now positive and equals
$${\mathbf{J} \wedge {\star}\mathbf{J}} = [\rho^2 + (j_x)^2 + (j_y)^2 + (j_z)^2]\,{\star}(1)$$
with the canonical volume form ${\star}(1) = \mathrm{d}t \wedge \mathrm{d}x \wedge \mathrm{d}y \wedge \mathrm{d}z$.

== Curved spacetime ==
=== Traditional formulation ===
Matter and energy generate curvature of spacetime. This is the subject of general relativity. Curvature of spacetime affects electrodynamics. An electromagnetic field having energy and momentum also generates curvature in spacetime. Maxwell's equations in curved spacetime can be obtained by replacing the derivatives in the equations in flat spacetime with covariant derivatives. (Whether this is the appropriate generalization requires separate investigation.) The sourced and source-free equations become (cgs-Gaussian units):
$${ 4 \pi \over c }j^{\beta} = \partial_{\alpha} F^{\alpha\beta} + {\Gamma^{\alpha}}_{\mu\alpha} F^{\mu\beta} + {\Gamma^{\beta}}_{\mu\alpha} F^{\alpha \mu} \ \stackrel{\mathrm{def}}{=}\ \nabla_{\alpha} F^{\alpha\beta} \ \stackrel{\mathrm{def}}{=}\ {F^{\alpha\beta}}_{;\alpha} \, \!$$
and
$$0 = \partial_{\gamma} F_{\alpha\beta} + \partial_{\beta} F_{\gamma\alpha} + \partial_{\alpha} F_{\beta\gamma} = \nabla_{\gamma} F_{\alpha\beta} + \nabla_{\beta} F_{\gamma\alpha} + \nabla_{\alpha} F_{\beta\gamma}.\,$$

Here,
$${\Gamma^{\alpha}}_{\mu\beta}$$
is a Christoffel symbol that characterizes the curvature of spacetime and ∇_{α} is the covariant derivative.

=== Formulation in terms of differential forms ===
The formulation of the Maxwell equations in terms of differential forms can be used without change in general relativity. The equivalence of the more traditional general relativistic formulation using the covariant derivative with the differential form formulation can be seen as follows. Choose local coordinates x^{α} that gives a basis of 1-forms dx^{α} in every point of the open set where the coordinates are defined. Using this basis and cgs-Gaussian units we define

- The antisymmetric field tensor F_{αβ}, corresponding to the field 2-form F
  $$\mathbf{F} = \frac{1}{2}F_{\alpha\beta} \,\mathrm{d}x^{\alpha} \wedge \mathrm{d}x^{\beta}.$$
- The current-vector infinitesimal 3-form J
  $$\mathbf{J} = {4 \pi \over c } \left ( \frac{1}{6} j^{\alpha} \sqrt{-g} \, \varepsilon_{\alpha\beta\gamma\delta} \mathrm{d}x^{\beta} \wedge \mathrm{d}x^{\gamma} \wedge \mathrm{d}x^{\delta}. \right)$$

The epsilon tensor contracted with the differential 3-form produces 6 times the number of terms required.

Here g is as usual the determinant of the matrix representing the metric tensor, g_{αβ}. A small computation that uses the symmetry of the Christoffel symbols (i.e., the torsion-freeness of the Levi-Civita connection) and the covariant constantness of the Hodge star operator then shows that in this coordinate neighborhood we have:

- the Bianchi identity
  $$\mathrm{d}\mathbf{F} = 2(\partial_{\gamma} F_{\alpha\beta} + \partial_{\beta} F_{\gamma\alpha} + \partial_{\alpha} F_{\beta\gamma})\mathrm{d}x^{\alpha}\wedge \mathrm{d}x^{\beta} \wedge \mathrm{d}x^{\gamma} = 0,$$
- the source equation
  $$\mathrm{d}{\star \mathbf{F}} = \frac{1}{6}{F^{\alpha\beta}}_{;\alpha}\sqrt{-g} \, \varepsilon_{\beta\gamma\delta\alpha}\mathrm{d}x^{\gamma} \wedge \mathrm{d}x^{\delta} \wedge \mathrm{d}x^{\alpha} = \mathbf{J},$$
- the continuity equation
  $$\mathrm{d}\mathbf{J} = { 4 \pi \over c } {j^{\alpha}}_{;\alpha} \sqrt{-g} \, \varepsilon_{\alpha\beta\gamma\delta}\mathrm{d}x^{\alpha}\wedge \mathrm{d}x^{\beta} \wedge \mathrm{d}x^{\gamma} \wedge \mathrm{d}x^{\delta} = 0.$$

== Classical electrodynamics as the curvature of a line bundle ==
An elegant and intuitive way to formulate Maxwell's equations is to use complex line bundles or a principal $\operatorname{U}(1)$-bundle, on the fibers of which U(1) acts regularly. The principal U(1)-connection ∇ on the line bundle has a curvature F = ∇^{2}, which is a two-form that automatically satisfies dF = 0 and can be interpreted as a field strength. If the line bundle is trivial with flat reference connection d we can write ∇ = d + A and F = dA with A the 1-form composed of the electric potential and the magnetic vector potential.

In quantum mechanics, the connection itself is used to define the dynamics of the system. This formulation allows a natural description of the Aharonov–Bohm effect. In this experiment, a static magnetic field runs through a long magnetic wire (e.g., an iron wire magnetized longitudinally). Outside of this wire the magnetic induction is zero, in contrast to the vector potential, which essentially depends on the magnetic flux through the cross-section of the wire and does not vanish outside. Since there is no electric field either, the Maxwell tensor F = 0 throughout the space-time region outside the tube, during the experiment. This means by definition that the connection ∇ is flat there.

In mentioned Aharonov–Bohm effect, however, the connection depends on the magnetic field through the tube since the holonomy along a non-contractible curve encircling the tube is the magnetic flux through the tube in the proper units. This can be detected quantum-mechanically with a double-slit electron diffraction experiment on an electron wave traveling around the tube. The holonomy corresponds to an extra phase shift, which leads to a shift in the diffraction pattern.

== Discussion and other approaches ==
Following are the reasons for using each of such formulations.

=== Potential formulation ===
In advanced classical mechanics it is often useful, and in quantum mechanics frequently essential, to express Maxwell's equations in a potential formulation involving the electric potential (also called scalar potential) φ, and the magnetic potential (a vector potential) A. For example, the analysis of radio antennas makes full use of Maxwell's vector and scalar potentials to separate the variables, a common technique used in formulating the solutions of differential equations. The potentials can be introduced by using the Poincaré lemma on the homogeneous equations to solve them in a universal way (this assumes that we consider a topologically simple, e.g. contractible space). The potentials are defined as in the table above. Alternatively, these equations define E and B in terms of the electric and magnetic potentials that then satisfy the homogeneous equations for E and B as identities. Substitution gives the non-homogeneous Maxwell equations in potential form.

Many different choices of A and φ are consistent with given observable electric and magnetic fields E and B, so the potentials seem to contain more, (classically) unobservable information. The non uniqueness of the potentials is well understood, however. For every scalar function of position and time λ(x, t), the potentials can be changed by a gauge transformation as
$$\varphi' = \varphi - \frac{\partial \lambda}{\partial t}, \quad \mathbf A' = \mathbf A + \mathbf \nabla \lambda$$
without changing the electric and magnetic field. Two pairs of gauge transformed potentials (φ, A) and (φ′, A′) are called gauge equivalent, and the freedom to select any pair of potentials in its gauge equivalence class is called gauge freedom. Again by the Poincaré lemma (and under its assumptions), gauge freedom is the only source of indeterminacy, so the field formulation is equivalent to the potential formulation if we consider the potential equations as equations for gauge equivalence classes.

The potential equations can be simplified using a procedure called gauge fixing. Since the potentials are only defined up to gauge equivalence, we are free to impose additional equations on the potentials, as long as for every pair of potentials there is a gauge equivalent pair that satisfies the additional equations (i.e. if the gauge fixing equations define a slice to the gauge action). The gauge-fixed potentials still have a gauge freedom under all gauge transformations that leave the gauge fixing equations invariant. Inspection of the potential equations suggests two natural choices. In the Coulomb gauge, we impose ∇ ⋅ A = 0, which is mostly used in the case of magneto statics when we can neglect the c^{−2}∂^{2}A/∂t^{2} term. In the Lorenz gauge (named after the Dane Ludvig Lorenz), we impose
$$\mathbf \nabla \cdot \mathbf A + \frac{1}{c^2} \frac{\partial \varphi}{\partial t} = 0\,.$$
The Lorenz gauge condition has the advantage of being Lorentz invariant and leading to Lorentz-invariant equations for the potentials.

=== Manifestly covariant (tensor) approach ===
Maxwell's equations are exactly consistent with special relativity—i.e., if they are valid in one inertial reference frame, then they are automatically valid in every other inertial reference frame. In fact, Maxwell's equations were crucial in the historical development of special relativity. However, in the usual formulation of Maxwell's equations, their consistency with special relativity is not obvious; it can only be proven by a laborious calculation.

For example, consider a conductor moving in the field of a magnet. In the frame of the magnet, that conductor experiences a magnetic force. But in the frame of a conductor moving relative to the magnet, the conductor experiences a force due to an electric field. The motion is exactly consistent in these two different reference frames, but it mathematically arises in quite different ways.

For this reason and others, it is often useful to rewrite Maxwell's equations in a way that is "manifestly covariant"—i.e. obviously consistent with special relativity, even with just a glance at the equations—using covariant and contravariant four-vectors and tensors. This can be done using the EM tensor F, or the 4-potential A, with the 4-current J.

=== Differential-forms approach ===
Gauss's law for magnetism and the Faraday–Maxwell law can be grouped together since the equations are homogeneous, and be seen as geometric identities expressing the field F (a 2-form), which can be derived from the 4-potential A. Gauss's law for electricity and the Ampere–Maxwell law could be seen as the dynamical equations of motion of the fields, obtained via the Lagrangian principle of least action, from the "interaction term" AJ (introduced through gauge covariant derivatives), coupling the field to matter. For the field formulation of Maxwell's equations in terms of a principle of extremal action, see electromagnetic tensor.

Often, the time derivative in the Faraday–Maxwell equation motivates calling this equation "dynamical", which is somewhat misleading in the sense of the preceding analysis. This is rather an artifact of breaking relativistic covariance by choosing a preferred time direction. To have physical degrees of freedom propagated by these field equations, one must include a kinetic term F ⋆F for A, and take into account the non-physical degrees of freedom that can be removed by gauge transformation A ↦ A − dα. See also gauge fixing and Faddeev–Popov ghosts.

=== Geometric calculus approach ===
This formulation uses the algebra that spacetime generates through the introduction of a distributive, associative (but not commutative) product called the geometric product. Elements and operations of the algebra can generally be associated with geometric meaning. The members of the algebra may be decomposed by grade (as in the formalism of differential forms) and the (geometric) product of a vector with a k-vector decomposes into a (k − 1)-vector and a (k + 1)-vector. The (k − 1)-vector component can be identified with the inner product and the (k + 1)-vector component with the outer product. It is of algebraic convenience that the geometric product is invertible, while the inner and outer products are not. As such, powerful techniques such as Green's functions can be used. The derivatives that appear in Maxwell's equations are vectors and electromagnetic fields are represented by the Faraday bivector F. This formulation is as general as that of differential forms for manifolds with a metric tensor, as then these are naturally identified with r-forms and there are corresponding operations. Maxwell's equations reduce to one equation in this formalism. This equation can be separated into parts as is done above for comparative reasons.

== See also ==
- Ricci calculus
- Electromagnetic wave equation
- Speed of light
- Electric constant
- Magnetic constant
- Free space
- Near and far field
- Electromagnetic field
- Electromagnetic radiation
- Quantum electrodynamics
- List of electromagnetism equations
