= Fritz Rohrlich =

American theoretical physicist

- Born: May 12, 1921; Vienna, Austria
- Died: November 14, 2018 (aged 97); DeWitt, New York
- Citizenship: Austria, United States
- Education: Technion (Diplom 1943); Harvard University (M.S. 1947, Ph.D. 1948)
- Known for: Quantum electrodynamics Classical charged particles
- Spouses: Beulah Friedman (m. 1951; died 1993) Phyllis Klein Lavelanet (m. 1994)
- Scientific career
- Fields: Theoretical physics
- Workplaces: Institute for Advanced Study; Princeton, Iowa, and Syracuse Universities
- Doctoral advisor: Julian Schwinger

Fritz Rohrlich (May 12, 1921 – November 14, 2018) was an American theoretical physicist and educator who published in the fields of quantum electrodynamics, classical electrodynamics of charged particles, and the philosophy of science.

== Life and work ==
Rohrlich was born in Vienna, Austria, in 1921. He was the son of Illy (née Schwarz) and Egon Rohrlich, a lawyer. His family was Jewish. His education was terminated after Austria was annexed by Germany in March, 1938 (the "Anschluss"). For a time he did forced labor. In 1939 he emigrated to study at the Technion in Haifa in modern-day Israel, where he was awarded a Diplom in industrial chemistry in 1943. He then began work in Jerusalem as a technician for the British armed forces. He was able to concurrently study physics with Giulio Racah at the Hebrew University of Jerusalem, which was his ultimate goal. In June 1942, his parents became victims of The Holocaust; they had been deported to the Sobibór Extermination Camp by the authorities in Austria.

In 1946, Rohrlich was accepted for graduate studies at Harvard University in the United States. He received a master's degree in 1947 and a doctorate in 1948; his doctoral thesis advisor was Julian Schwinger. At Harvard, he was also a teaching assistant for Norman Foster Ramsey. In 1948, he joined the Institute for Advanced Study in Princeton, New Jersey; as Max Jammer wrote much later, "For Rohrlich this was one of the highlights of his life: he met Einstein, Pais, Placzek, Uhlenbeck, Dyson, and the mathematicians Gödel, von Neumann, and Weyl; he was present when von Laue and Yukawa visited the Institute." In 1949, he became a research associate with Hans Bethe at Cornell University. There he met Richard Feynman, which revived his interest in the problems of divergences in the classical electrodynamic theory for charged particles, for which he later became a leading expert. At the same time, he also made significant contributions to the establishment of early quantum electrodynamics, and in particular he demonstrated the equivalence of the various formulations for spin-0 particles, after Freeman Dyson had demonstrated the version of spin-½ particles).

In 1951, he became an assistant professor at Princeton University. There he gave lectures on quantum electrodynamics from which his seminal textbook, written with Josef-Maria Jauch, emerged. In 1953 he became an associate professor (and colleague of Jauch) at the University of Iowa; the text The theory of Photons and Electrons was first published in 1955. In 1963 he became a professor at Syracuse University, where he spent the rest of his career; his text Classical Charged Particles was first published in 1965. In addition to his work in theories of quantum and classical electrodynamics, in the early 1960s he also investigated (with T. Fulton and Louis Witten) the problem of the radiation of the free-falling charged particle in the general theory of relativity and the question of whether this violated the principle of equivalence. In the 1980s, he put his focus on the philosophy of science, and wrote the text From Paradox to Reality: Our Basic Concepts of the Physical World. In 1991 he retired and became a professor emeritus. He remained active in research for many years thereafter, and in 2009 was honored by the lifetime "outstanding referee" designation of the American Physical Society.

In 1957 he was selected as a fellow of the American Physical Society. In 1974 he received a Fulbright Award to visit the University of Graz, and in 1996 he received an honorary doctorate from that university.

Rohrlich died November 14, 2018, in DeWitt, New York.

== Selected works ==
=== Research articles ===
- Thomas Fulton, Fritz Rohrlich. Classical radiation from a uniformly accelerating charge . In: Annals of Physics, Vol. 9 (1960), pp. 499–517.
- An elementary derivation of E = mc². In: American Journal of Physics, Volume 58, Issue 4 (1990), p. 348.
- The dynamics of a charged sphere and the electron. In: American Journal of Physics, Volume 65, Issue 11 (1997), p. 1051.

=== Books ===
- (with Josef-Maria Jauch) The Theory of Photons and Electrons. The Relativistic Quantum Field Theory of Charged Particles with Spin One-half (Second (corrected) ed.). Berlin: Springer. 1980. ISBN 9780387072951. OCLC 1072438784. (First edition 1955).
- Classical Charged Particles (Third ed.). Hackensack, NJ: World Scientific Press. 2007. ISBN 978-981-270-004-9. OCLC 938125798. (First edition 1965; Second edition 1990).
- From Paradox to Reality. Our Basic Concepts of the Physical World. Cambridge: Cambridge University Press. 1987. ISBN 0-521-30749-X. OCLC 152510060.
