= Mary Laura Chalk Rowles =

Canadian physicist

- Born: 1904; Quebec, Canada
- Died: February 14, 1996 (aged 91–92); Montreal, Canada
- Education: McGill University, B.A. 1925; McGill University, M.Sc. 1926; McGill University, Ph.D. 1928
- Scientific career
- Fields: Quantum mechanics Stark effect
- Workplaces: McGill University; King's College London
- Thesis: Observed Relative Intensities of Stark Components in Hydrogen
- Doctoral advisor: John Stuart Foster

Mary Laura Chalk Rowles (1904 – February 14, 1996) was a Canadian physicist and the first woman to earn a Ph.D. in physics from McGill University. She is best known for having conducted an early experimental verification of Erwin Schrödinger's wave formulation of quantum mechanics with John Stuart Foster.

== Early life and education ==
Mary Laura Chalk Rowles was born Mary Laura Chalk in 1904 to Walter Chalk and Nina Howe in the Eastern Townships of Quebec. She had a twin, Lilian, who died in 1909, as well as two brothers Harry and Arthur.

Rowles was interested in art and mathematics in school. In 1921 at her high school graduation she won the Macdonald Entrance Scholarship to McGill University. In her first year at McGill, she took a physics course from Arthur S. Eve which inspired her to switch her enrollment from the arts to mathematics and physics.

Rowles earned her bachelor's degree in 1925. Upon graduation she won the Anne Molson Gold Medal for achievements in mathematics, science, and physics as well as a National Research Council Bursary. She stayed at McGill for her graduate education, earning an MSc in 1926, and a Ph.D. in 1928. Her M.Sc. was entitled "Potential distributions in the Crookes dark space and relative intensities of Stark effect components of H-β and He-λ" and was supervised by Otto Maass. Her Ph.D. thesis was entitled "Observed relative intensities of Stark components in hydrogen" and advised by John Stuart Foster. Rowles attended graduate school at the same time at McGill as her future husband, William Rowles, who also worked under Foster.

== Career and research ==
Rowles's doctoral work concerned the Stark effect in hydrogen. In this research, she used a Lo Surdo tube to measure the intensities of spectral lines in hydrogen when exposed to an electric field. Rowles's Ph.D. thesis was among the first published experimental data confirming Erwin Schrödinger's wave mechanics formulation of quantum mechanics which had been published in 1926. While Foster's own work on the Stark effect in helium had confirmed already-known experimental facts, Rowles confirmed new predictions.

Rowles applied for a Moyse Travelling Scholarship, but it was denied because of a rumor that she was engaged to be married. She worked for another year in Foster's laboratory and applied for a second time for the scholarship, this time successfully.

From 1929 to 1930, Rowles worked with Owen Willans Richardson at King's College London, where she conducted research on thermionic emission. Richardson presented her work to the Royal Society because she was not a fellow. While in Europe she received an appointment to teach physics at Macdonald College.

In 1931 she married William Rowles who was then chair of the physics department. In 1936 Rowles lost her position. According to Rowles, in response to the economic pressure of the Great Depression, McGill University enforced an anti-nepotism rule stating that no women could be employed in the same university department as their husbands. No such rule was on the books at McGill University at the time, however anti-nepotism practices were often invoked by university administration at their own discretion.

After her dismissal she did volunteer work and hosted social events for the university. She also taught as needed, including during World War II when she taught a course on electricity to members of the Royal Canadian Air Force who were training as radar officers.

== Death and legacy ==
In 1995 the student services building on the Macdonald Campus was named the Rowles House in honor of Laura and William Rowles.

William Rowles died on November 15, 1989. Mary Laura Rowles died in 1996 at the age of 92. She was cremated and buried next to her husband in Woodlawn Cemetery in Saskatoon, Canada.

Rowles's will endowed the Chalk Rowles Fellowship, a graduate fellowship in physics at McGill University in honor of her husband.

== Publications ==
- Foster, John Stuart, and Mary Laura Chalk. 1928. "Observed Relative Intensities of Stark Components of Hα." Nature 121, 830–831. https://doi.org/10.1038/121830b0
- Foster, John Stuart, and Mary Laura Chalk. 1929. "Relative Intensities of Stark Components in Hydrogen." Proceedings of the Royal Society of London A 123: 108–118. https://doi.org/10.1098/rspa.1929.0058
- Chalk, M. Laura. 1930. "The spectrum of H2: The bands ending on 2p^{1} Π." Proceedings of the Royal Society of London A 128: 579–587. http://doi.org/10.1098/rspa.1930.0132
