= Henry A. Bumstead =

American physicist

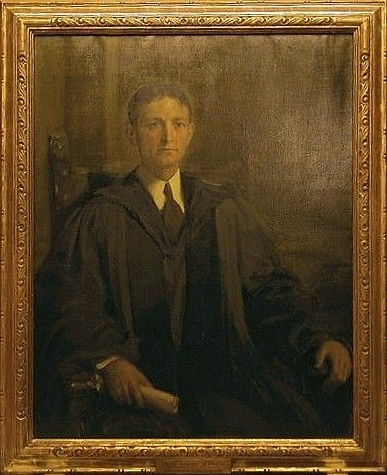
- Portrait from 1914
- Born: March 12, 1870; Pekin, Illinois, US
- Died: December 31, 1920 (aged 50); On a train between Chicago and Washington, D.C.
- Education: Johns Hopkins University; Yale University
- Scientific career
- Fields: Physicist
- Workplaces: Yale University
- Doctoral advisor: Josiah Willard Gibbs; Henry Augustus Rowland
- Doctoral students: Leigh Page; Harry Nyquist; John Stuart Foster

Henry Andrews Bumstead (March 12, 1870 – December 31, 1920) was an American physicist who taught at Yale from 1897 to 1920. In 1918 he was scientific attache to the United States embassy in London. In 1920 he was Chairman of the National Research Council.

== Education ==
Henry was a high school student in Decatur, Illinois. In 1887 he went to Johns Hopkins University, initially as a student in a pre-medical program. He studied mathematics with Fabian Franklin and took up an interest in that subject. He studied physics with Henry Augustus Rowland and found his calling there. In 1891 he obtained the bachelor's degree and continued at Johns Hopkins as an assistant in the physics laboratory and a graduate student. He studied thermodynamics, electrostatics, and the electromagnetic theory of light.

== Career ==
Henry Bumstead became an instructor at the Sheffield Scientific School of Yale University in 1893, working with Charles S. Hastings. At the same time he became a student of Willard Gibbs, learning vector analysis and continuing the study of thermodynamics and the electromagnetic theory of light. He was awarded the Ph.D. in 1897, composing a thesis A Comparison of Electrodynamic Theories. Bumstead became an assistant professor in 1900.

In 1905 Bumstead spent a sabbatical year at the Cavendish Laboratory. Performing an experiment suggested by J. J. Thomson, Bumstead examined the effect of X-rays (then called Röntgen rays) when applied to lead and zinc, finding that "twice as much heat is produced in lead compared to zinc".

When Arthur Williams Wright retired in 1906, Bumstead became professor of physics at Yale College and Director of the Sloan Physics Laboratory.

In World War I Bumstead was selected to serve as the head of the Scientific Section in London under Admiral William Sims, Commander of the American Forces countering the U-boat campaign in the North Atlantic:

The American headquarters in London comprised many separate departments, each one of which was responsible to me as the Force Commander, through the Chief of Staff, they included such indispensable branches as...the Scientific Section, Professor H. A. Bumstead, Ph.D.

In 1920 Bumstead was elected Chairman of the National Research Council. He was a member of the Connecticut Academy of Arts and Sciences, the United States National Academy of Sciences, the American Academy of Arts and Sciences, and the American Philosophical Society.

== Personal life ==
In 1896 Bumstead married Luetta Ullrich, daughter of John Ullrich, a banker of Decatur, Illinois. The couple had two children, John Henry (born 1897) and Eleanor (born 1902). John Henry became a medical doctor in 1923, after study at Johns Hopkins University. He later joined Yale Medical School. Eleanor married William E. Stevenson, a president of Oberlin College (1946–59).

== See also ==
- Leigh Page
- Harry Nyquist
