= Foster (crater) =

Lunar impact crater

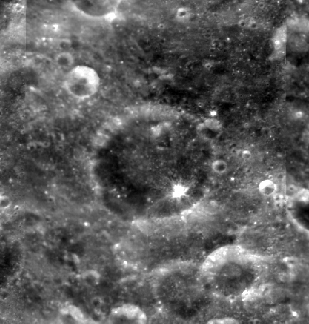
- Foster lunar crater (center)
- Coordinates: 23.7°N 141.5°W
- Diameter: 37.02 km (23.00 mi)
- Depth: Unknown
- Colongitude: 142° at sunrise
- Eponym: John S. Foster

Foster is a small lunar impact crater that lies to the southeast of the larger crater Joule, on the far side of the Moon. It has a diameter of 37 km. Further to the east-northeast is the crater Bronk.

The rim of Foster is slightly eroded, and the narrow inner walls slope directly down to the relatively level interior floor. The rim has a small outward bulge along the southwest side. There is a small craterlet on the floor next to the northern rim. A tiny impact in the southeast part of the crater interior is surrounded by a small skirt of high albedo material, producing a bright patch.

This formation is named after Canadian physicist John Stuart Foster (1890-1964). Its designation was formally adopted by the International Astronomical Union in 1970.

== Satellite craters ==
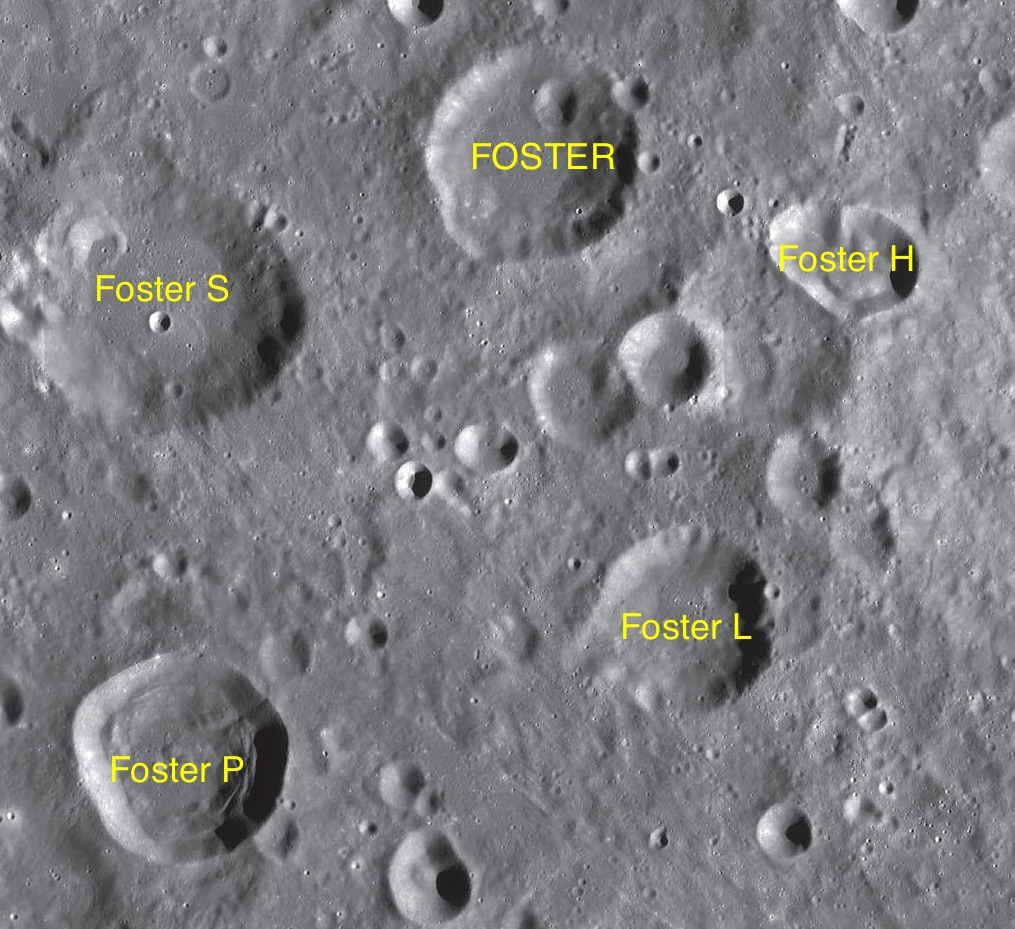
Satellite features of Foster

By convention these features are identified on lunar maps by placing the letter on the side of the crater midpoint that is closest to Foster.

Foster	Latitude	Longitude	Diameter
H	23.2° N	139.6° W	25 km
L	21.0° N	140.5° W	32 km
P	20.2° N	143.5° W	36 km
S	22.9° N	143.7° W	36 km
