= Clarence, Nova Scotia =

Community in Nova Scotia, Canada

Coordinates: 44°53′43.89″N 65°14′24.28″W

Clarence in Nova Scotia

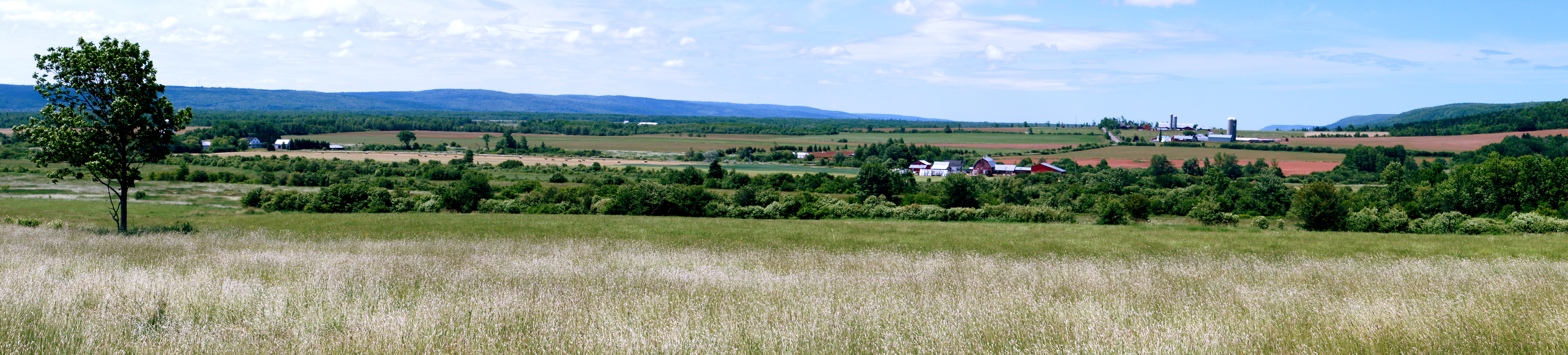
Farms in Clarence, Annapolis Valley, Nova Scotia

Clarence is a community in the Canadian province of Nova Scotia, located in Annapolis County. Along with Fort Clarence (Nova Scotia), the community is named in honour of the Duke of Clarence and St. Andrews, later King William IV.

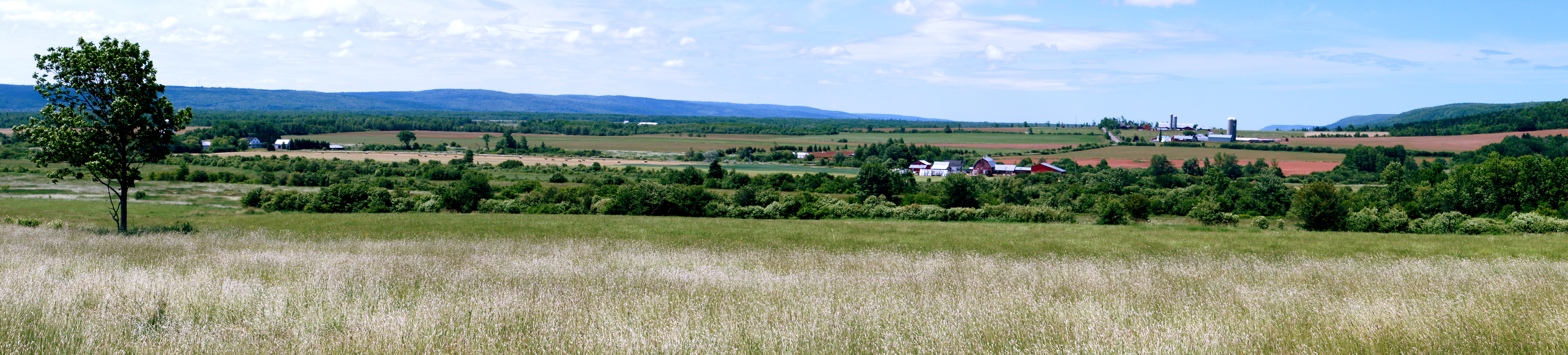
Looking west southwest across the expansive farms in Clarence, Annapolis Valley, Nova Scotia
