= Paradox of radiation of charged particles in a gravitational field =

Apparent paradox in the context of general relativity

The paradox of a charge in a gravitational field is an apparent physical paradox in the context of general relativity. A charged particle at rest in a gravitational field, such as on the surface of the Earth, must be supported by a force to prevent it from falling. According to the equivalence principle, it should be indistinguishable from a particle in flat spacetime being accelerated by a force. Maxwell's equations say that an accelerated charge should radiate electromagnetic waves, yet such radiation is not observed for stationary particles in gravitational fields.

One of the first to study this problem was Max Born in his 1909 paper about the consequences of a charge in uniformly accelerated frame. Earlier concerns and possible solutions were raised by Wolfgang Pauli (1918), Max von Laue (1919), and others, but the most recognized work on the subject is the resolution of Thomas Fulton and Fritz Rohrlich in 1960.

== Background ==
During the Apollo 15 mission in 1971, astronaut David Scott demonstrated the theory of Galileo: acceleration is the same for all bodies subject to gravity on the Moon, even for a hammer and a feather. The paradox in this article considers the consequences of an experiment where one of the objects to release is electrically charged.

It is a standard result from Maxwell's equations of classical electrodynamics that an accelerated charge radiates. That is, it produces an electric field that falls off as $1/r$ in addition to its rest-frame $1/r^2$ Coulomb field. This radiation electric field has an accompanying magnetic field, and the whole oscillating electromagnetic radiation field propagates independently of the accelerated charge, carrying away momentum and energy. The energy in the radiation is provided by the work that accelerates the charge.

The theory of general relativity is built on the equivalence principle of gravitation and inertia. This principle states that it is impossible to distinguish through any local measurement whether one is in a gravitational field or being accelerated. An elevator out in deep space, far from any planet, could mimic a gravitational field to its occupants if it could be accelerated continuously "upward". Whether the acceleration is from motion or from gravity makes no difference in the laws of physics. One can also understand it in terms of the equivalence of so-called gravitational mass and inertial mass. The mass in Newton's law of universal gravitation (gravitational mass) is the same as the mass in Newton's second law of motion (inertial mass). They cancel out when equated, with the result discovered by Galileo Galilei in 1638, that all bodies fall at the same rate in a gravitational field, independent of their mass. A famous demonstration of this principle was performed on the Moon during the Apollo 15 mission, when a hammer and a feather were dropped at the same time and struck the surface at the same time.

Closely tied in with this equivalence is the fact that gravity vanishes in free fall. For objects falling in an elevator whose cable is cut, all gravitational forces vanish, and things begin to look like the free-floating absence of forces one sees in videos from the International Space Station. It is a linchpin of general relativity that everything must fall together in free fall. Just as with acceleration versus gravity, no experiment should be able to distinguish the effects of free fall in a gravitational field, and being out in deep space far from any forces.

== Statement of the paradox ==
Putting together these two basic facts of general relativity and electrodynamics, we seem to encounter a paradox. For if we dropped a neutral particle and a charged particle together in a gravitational field, the charged particle should begin to radiate as it is accelerated under gravity, thereby losing energy and slowing relative to the neutral particle. Then a free-falling observer could distinguish free fall from the true absence of forces, because a charged particle in a free-falling laboratory would begin to be pulled upward relative to the neutral parts of the laboratory, even though no obvious electric fields were present.

Equivalently, we can think about a charged particle at rest in a laboratory on the surface of the Earth. In order to be at rest, it must be supported by something which exerts an upward force on it. This system is equivalent to being in outer space accelerated constantly upward at 1 g, and we know that a charged particle accelerated upward at 1 g would radiate. However, we do not see radiation from charged particles at rest in the laboratory. It would seem that we could distinguish between a gravitational field and acceleration, because an electric charge apparently only radiates when it is being accelerated through motion, but not through gravitation.

== Resolution by Rohrlich ==
The resolution of this paradox, like the twin paradox and ladder paradox, comes through appropriate care in distinguishing frames of reference. This section follows the analysis of Fritz Rohrlich (1965), who shows that a charged particle and a neutral particle fall equally fast in a gravitational field. Likewise, a charged particle at rest in a gravitational field does not radiate in its rest frame, but it does so in the frame of a free-falling observer. The equivalence principle is preserved for charged particles.

The key is to realize that the laws of electrodynamics, Maxwell's equations, hold only within an inertial frame, that is, in a frame in which all forces act locally, and there is no net acceleration when the net local forces are zero. The frame could be free fall under gravity, or far in space away from any forces. The surface of the Earth is not an inertial frame, as it is being constantly accelerated. We know that the surface of the Earth is not an inertial frame because an object at rest there may not remain at rest—objects at rest fall to the ground when released. Gravity is a non-local fictitious "force" within the Earth's surface frame, just like centrifugal "force". So we cannot naively formulate expectations based on Maxwell's equations in this frame. It is remarkable that we now understand the special-relativistic Maxwell equations do not hold, strictly speaking, on the surface of the Earth, even though they were discovered in electrical and magnetic experiments conducted in laboratories on the surface of the Earth. (This is similar to how the concept of mechanics in an inertial frame is not applicable to the surface of the Earth even disregarding gravity due to its rotation - cf. e.g. Foucault pendulum, yet they were originally found from considering ground experiments and intuitions.) Therefore, in this case, we cannot apply Maxwell's equations to the description of a falling charge relative to a "supported", non-inertial observer.

Maxwell's equations can be applied relative to an observer in free fall, because free-fall is an inertial frame. So the starting point of considerations is to work in the free-fall frame in a gravitational field—a "falling" observer. In the free-fall frame, Maxwell's equations have their usual, flat-spacetime form for the falling observer. In this frame, the electric and magnetic fields of the charge are simple: the falling electric field is just the Coulomb field of a charge at rest, and the magnetic field is zero. As an aside, note that we are building in the equivalence principle from the start, including the assumption that a charged particle falls equally as fast as a neutral particle.

The fields measured by an observer supported on the surface of the Earth are different. Given the electric and magnetic fields in the falling frame, we have to transform those fields into the frame of the supported observer. This manipulation is not a Lorentz transformation, because the two frames have a relative acceleration. Instead, the machinery of general relativity must be used.

In this case the gravitational field is fictitious because it can be "transformed away" by appropriate choice of coordinate system in the falling frame. Unlike the total gravitational field of the Earth, here we are assuming that spacetime is locally flat, so that the curvature tensor vanishes. Equivalently, the lines of gravitational acceleration are everywhere parallel, with no convergences measurable in the laboratory. Then the most general static, flat-space, cylindrical metric and line element can be written:

$$c^2 d\tau^2 = u^2(z)c^2dt^2 - \left( \frac{c^2}{g} \frac{du}{dz} \right)^2 dz^2 - dx^2 - dy^2,$$

where $c$ is the speed of light, $\tau$ is proper time, $x, y, z, t$ are the usual coordinates of space and time, $g$ is the acceleration of the gravitational field, and $u(z)$ is an arbitrary function of the coordinate but must approach the observed Newtonian value of $1 + gz/c^2$. This formula is the metric for the gravitational field measured by the supported observer.

Meanwhile, the metric in the frame of the falling observer is simply the Minkowski metric:

$$c^2 d\tau^2 = c^2 dt'^2 - dz'^2 - dx'^2 - dy'^2.$$

From these two metrics Rohrlich constructs the coordinate transformation between them:

$$\begin{align}
x' &= x, \\
y' &= y, \\
\frac{g}{c^2} (z' - z_0') &= u(z) \cosh\left(\frac{g}{c}(t - t_0)\right) - 1,\\
\frac{g}{c} (t' - t_0') &= u(z) \sinh\left(\frac{g}{c}(t - t_0)\right).
\end{align}$$

When this coordinate transformation is applied to the electric and magnetic fields of the charge in the rest frame, it is found to be radiating. Rohrlich emphasizes that this charge remains at rest in its free-fall frame, just as a neutral particle would. Furthermore, the radiation rate for this situation is Lorentz-invariant, but it is not invariant under the coordinate transformation above because it is not a Lorentz transformation.

To see whether the supported charge should radiate, we start again in the falling frame.

As observed from the freefalling frame, the supported charge appears to be accelerated uniformly upward. The case of constant acceleration of a charge is treated by Rohrlich. He finds a charge $e$ uniformly accelerated at rate $g$ has a radiation rate given by the Lorentz invariant:

$$R = \frac{2}{3} \frac{e^2}{c^3} g^2.$$

The corresponding electric and magnetic fields of an accelerated charge are also given in Rohrlich. To find the fields of the charge in the supporting frame, the fields of the uniformly accelerated charge are transformed according to the coordinate transformation previously given. When that is done, one finds no radiation in the supporting frame from a supported charge, because the magnetic field is zero in this frame. Rohrlich does note that the gravitational field slightly distorts the Coulomb field of the supported charge, but not enough to be observable. So although the Coulomb law was discovered in a supporting frame, general relativity tells us that the field of such a charge is not precisely $1/r^2$.

=== Fate of the radiation ===
The radiation from the supported charge viewed in the freefalling frame (or vice versa) is something of a curiosity: one might ask where it goes. David G. Boulware (1980) finds that the radiation goes into a region of spacetime inaccessible to the co-accelerating, supported observer. In effect, a uniformly accelerated observer has an event horizon, and there are regions of spacetime inaccessible to this observer. Camila de Almeida and Alberto Saa (2006) have a more accessible treatment of the event horizon of the accelerated observer.

== See also ==
- Moving magnet and conductor problem
