= Manifest covariance =

Equation in which all expressions are tensors

In general relativity, a manifestly covariant equation is one in which all expressions are tensors. The operations of addition, tensor multiplication, tensor contraction, raising and lowering indices, and covariant differentiation may appear in the equation. Forbidden terms include but are not restricted to partial derivatives. Tensor densities, especially integrands and variables of integration, may be allowed in manifestly covariant equations if they are clearly weighted by the appropriate power of the determinant of the metric.

Writing an equation in manifestly covariant form is useful because it guarantees general covariance upon quick inspection. If an equation is manifestly covariant, and if it reduces to a correct, corresponding equation in special relativity when evaluated instantaneously in a local inertial frame, then it is usually the correct generalization of the special relativistic equation in general relativity.

== Example ==
An equation may be Lorentz covariant even if it is not manifestly covariant. Consider the electromagnetic field tensor

$$F_{ab} \, = \, \partial_a A_b \, - \, \partial_b A_a \,$$

where $A_a$ is the electromagnetic four-potential in the Lorenz gauge. The equation above contains partial derivatives and is therefore not manifestly covariant. Note that the partial derivatives may be written in terms of covariant derivatives and Christoffel symbols as

$$\partial_a A_b = \nabla_a A_b + \Gamma^c_{ab} A_c$$
$$\partial_b A_a = \nabla_b A_a + \Gamma^c_{ba} A_c$$

For a torsion-free metric assumed in general relativity, we may appeal to the symmetry of the Christoffel symbols

$$\Gamma^c_{ab} - \Gamma^c_{ba} = 0,$$

which allows the field tensor to be written in manifestly covariant form

$$F_{ab} \, = \, \nabla_a A_b \, - \, \nabla_b A_a .$$

== See also ==
- Lorentz covariance
- Introduction to the mathematics of general relativity

== Bibliography ==
- C. B. Parker (1994). McGraw Hill Encyclopaedia of Physics (2nd ed.). McGraw Hill.
- John Archibald Wheeler; C. Misner; K. S. Thorne (1973). Gravitation. W.H. Freeman & Co.
