= Electric potential energy =

Potential energy that results from conservative Coulomb forces

- Common symbols: U_{E}
- SI unit: joule (J)
- Derivations from other quantities: U_{E} = C · V^{2} / 2

Electric potential energy is a potential energy (measured in joules) that results from conservative Coulomb forces and is associated with the configuration of a particular set of point charges within a defined system. An object may be said to have electric potential energy by virtue of either its own electric charge or its relative position to other electrically charged objects.

The term "electric potential energy" is used to describe the potential energy in systems with time-variant electric fields, while the term "electrostatic potential energy" is used to describe the potential energy in systems with time-invariant electric fields.

== Definition ==
The electric potential energy of a system of point charges is defined as the work required to assemble this system of charges by bringing them close together, as in the system from an infinite distance. Alternatively, the electric potential energy of any given charge or system of charges is termed as the total work done by an external agent in bringing the charge or the system of charges from infinity to the present configuration without undergoing any acceleration.

The electrostatic potential energy, U_{E}, of one point charge q at position r in the presence of an electric field E is defined as the negative of the work W done by the electrostatic force to bring it from the reference position r_{ref} (Note: The reference zero is usually taken to be a state in which the individual point charges are very well separated ("are at infinite separation") and are at rest.) to that position r.

$$\begin{aligned}
U_\mathrm{E}(\mathbf r) &= -W_{r_\text{ref} \to r } \\
&= -\int_{\mathbf{r}_\text{ref}}^\mathbf{r} q\mathbf{E}(\mathbf{r'}) \cdot \mathrm{d} \mathbf{r'}
\end{aligned}$$

where E is the electrostatic field and dr' is the displacement vector in a curve from the reference position r_{ref} to the final position r.

The electrostatic potential energy can also be defined from the electric potential as follows:

The electrostatic potential energy, U_{E}, of one point charge q at position r in the presence of an electric potential $V$ is defined as the product of the charge and the electric potential.

$$U_\mathrm{E}(\mathbf r) = qV(\mathbf r)$$

where $V$ is the electric potential generated by the charges, which is a function of position r.

== Units ==
The SI unit of electric potential energy is joule (named after the English physicist James Prescott Joule). In the CGS system the erg is the unit of energy, being equal to 10^{−7} Joules. Also electronvolts may be used, 1 eV = 1.602×10^{−19} Joules.

== Electrostatic potential energy of one point charge ==
=== One point charge q in the presence of another point charge Q ===
A point charge q in the electric field of another charge Q.

The electrostatic potential energy, U_{E}, of one point charge q at position r in the presence of a point charge Q, taking an infinite separation between the charges as the reference position, is:

$$U_E(\mathbf r) =  \frac{1}{4\pi \varepsilon_0} \frac{qQ}{r}$$

where r is the distance between the point charges q and Q, and q and Q are the charges (not the absolute values of the charges—i.e., an electron would have a negative value of charge when placed in the formula). The following outline of proof states the derivation from the definition of electric potential energy and Coulomb's law to this formula.

Outline of proof

The electrostatic force F acting on a charge q can be written in terms of the electric field E as
$$\mathbf{F} = q\mathbf{E} ,$$

By definition, the change in electrostatic potential energy, U_{E}, of a point charge q that has moved from the reference position r_{ref} to position r in the presence of an electric field E is the negative of the work done by the electrostatic force to bring it from the reference position r_{ref} to that position r.

$$U_E(r) - U_E(r_{\rm ref}) = -W_{r_{\rm ref} \rightarrow r } = -\int_{{r}_{\rm ref}}^r q\mathbf{E} \cdot \mathrm{d} \mathbf{s} .$$

where:

- r = position in 3d space of the charge q, using cartesian coordinates r = (x, y, z), taking the position of the Q charge at r = (0,0,0), the scalar r = |r| is the norm of the position vector,
- ds = differential displacement vector along a path C going from r_{ref} to r,
- $W_{r_\text{ref} \to r }$ is the work done by the electrostatic force to bring the charge from the reference position r_{ref} to r,

Usually U_{E} is set to zero when r_{ref} is infinity:
$$U_E (r_{\rm ref}=\infty) = 0$$
so
$$U_E(r) = - \int_\infty^r q\mathbf{E} \cdot \mathrm{d} \mathbf{s}$$

When the curl ∇ × E is zero, the line integral above does not depend on the specific path C chosen but only on its endpoints. This happens in time-invariant electric fields. When talking about electrostatic potential energy, time-invariant electric fields are always assumed so, in this case, the electric field is conservative and Coulomb's law can be used.

Using Coulomb's law, it is known that the electrostatic force F and the electric field E created by a discrete point charge Q are radially directed from Q. By the definition of the position vector r and the displacement vector s, it follows that r and s are also radially directed from Q. So, E and ds must be parallel:

$$\mathbf{E} \cdot \mathrm{d} \mathbf{s} = \left|\mathbf{E}\right| \cdot \left|\mathrm{d}\mathbf{s}\right| \cos(0) = E \, \mathrm{d}s$$

Using Coulomb's law, the electric field is given by

$$\left|\mathbf{E}\right| = E = \frac{1}{4\pi\varepsilon_0}\frac{Q}{s^2}$$

and the integral can be easily evaluated:

$$U_E(r) = -\int_\infty^r q\mathbf{E} \cdot \mathrm{d} \mathbf{s} = -\int_\infty^r \frac{1}{4\pi\varepsilon_0}\frac{qQ}{s^2} \, \mathrm{d}s = \frac{1}{4\pi\varepsilon_0}\frac{qQ}{r} = k_e\frac{qQ}{r}$$

=== One point charge q in the presence of n point charges Q_{i} ===
Electrostatic potential energy of q due to Q_{1} and Q_{2} charge system:$U_E = \frac{q}{4\pi\varepsilon_0} \left(\frac{Q_1}{r_1} + \frac{Q_2}{r_2} \right)$

The electrostatic potential energy, U_{E}, of one point charge q in the presence of n point charges Q_{i}, taking an infinite separation between the charges as the reference position, is:

$$U_E(r) =  \frac{q}{4\pi\varepsilon_0} \sum_{i=1}^n \frac{Q_i}{r_i},$$

where r_{i} is the distance between the point charges q and Q_{i}, and q and Q_{i} are the assigned values of the charges.

== Electrostatic potential energy stored in a system of point charges ==
The electrostatic potential energy U_{E} stored in a system of N charges q_{1}, q_{2}, …, q_{N} at positions r_{1}, r_{2}, …, r_{N} respectively, is:

$$U_\mathrm{E} = \frac{1}{2} \sum_{i=1}^N q_i V(\mathbf{r}_i) = \frac{1}{2} k_e\sum_{i=1}^N q_i \sum_\stackrel{j=1}{j \ne i}^N \frac{q_j}{r_{ij}},$$	1

where, for each i value, V(r_{i}) is the electrostatic potential due to all point charges except the one at r_{i}, (Note: The factor of one half accounts for the 'double counting' of charge pairs. For example, consider the case of just two charges.) and is equal to:
$$V(\mathbf{r}_i) = k_e\sum_\stackrel{j=1}{j \ne i}^N \frac{q_j}{r_{ij}},$$
where r_{ij} is the distance between q_{i} and q_{j}.

Outline of proof

The electrostatic potential energy U_{E} stored in a system of two charges is equal to the electrostatic potential energy of a charge in the electrostatic potential generated by the other. That is to say, if charge q_{1} generates an electrostatic potential V_{1}, which is a function of position r, then
$$U_\mathrm{E} = q_2 V_1(\mathbf r_2).$$

Doing the same calculation with respect to the other charge, we obtain
$$U_\mathrm{E} = q_1 V_2(\mathbf r_1).$$

The electrostatic potential energy is mutually shared by $q_1$ and $q_2$, so the total stored energy is
$$U_E = \frac{1}{2}\left[q_2 V_1(\mathbf r_2) + q_1 V_2(\mathbf r_1)\right]$$

This can be generalized to say that the electrostatic potential energy U_{E} stored in a system of n charges q_{1}, q_{2}, …, q_{n} at positions r_{1}, r_{2}, …, r_{n} respectively, is:

$$U_\mathrm{E} = \frac{1}{2}\sum_{i=1}^n q_i V(\mathbf{r}_i).$$

=== Energy stored in a system of one point charge ===
The electrostatic potential energy of a system containing only one point charge is zero, as there are no other sources of electrostatic force against which an external agent must do work in moving the point charge from infinity to its final location.

A common question arises concerning the interaction of a point charge with its own electrostatic potential. Since this interaction doesn't act to move the point charge itself, it doesn't contribute to the stored energy of the system.

=== Energy stored in a system of two point charges ===
Consider bringing a point charge, q, into its final position near a point charge, Q_{1}. The electric potential V(r) due to Q_{1} is
$$V(\mathbf r) = k_e \frac{Q_1}{r}$$

Hence we obtain, the electrostatic potential energy of q in the potential of Q_{1} as
$$U_E = \frac{1}{4\pi\varepsilon_0} \frac{q Q_1}{r_1}$$
where r_{1} is the separation between the two point charges.

=== Energy stored in a system of three point charges ===
The electrostatic potential energy of a system of three charges should not be confused with the electrostatic potential energy of Q_{1} due to two charges Q_{2} and Q_{3}, because the latter doesn't include the electrostatic potential energy of the system of the two charges Q_{2} and Q_{3}.

The electrostatic potential energy stored in the system of three charges is:
$$U_\mathrm{E} = \frac{1}{4\pi\varepsilon_0} \left[ \frac{Q_1 Q_2}{r_{12}} + \frac{Q_1 Q_3}{r_{13}} + \frac{Q_2 Q_3}{r_{23}} \right]$$

Outline of proof

Using the formula given in (1), the electrostatic potential energy of the system of the three charges will then be:
$$U_\mathrm{E} = \frac{1}{2} \left[ Q_1 V(\mathbf{r}_1) + Q_2 V(\mathbf{r}_2) + Q_3 V(\mathbf{r}_3) \right]$$

Where $V(\mathbf{r}_1)$ is the electric potential in r_{1} created by charges Q_{2} and Q_{3}, $V(\mathbf{r}_2)$ is the electric potential in r_{2} created by charges Q_{1} and Q_{3}, and $V(\mathbf{r}_3)$ is the electric potential in r_{3} created by charges Q_{1} and Q_{2}. The potentials are:

$$V(\mathbf{r}_1) = V_2(\mathbf{r}_1) + V_3(\mathbf{r}_1) = \frac{1}{4\pi\varepsilon_0} \frac{Q_2}{r_{12}} + \frac{1}{4\pi\varepsilon_0} \frac{Q_3}{r_{13}}$$
$$V(\mathbf{r}_2) = V_1(\mathbf{r}_2) + V_3(\mathbf{r}_2) = \frac{1}{4\pi\varepsilon_0} \frac{Q_1}{r_{21}} + \frac{1}{4\pi\varepsilon_0} \frac{Q_3}{r_{23}}$$
$$V(\mathbf{r}_3) = V_1(\mathbf{r}_3) + V_2(\mathbf{r}_3) = \frac{1}{4\pi\varepsilon_0} \frac{Q_1}{r_{31}} + \frac{1}{4\pi\varepsilon_0} \frac{Q_2}{r_{32}}$$

Where r_{ij} is the distance between charge Q_{i} and Q_{j}.

If we add everything:

$$U_\mathrm{E} = \frac{1}{2} \frac{1}{4\pi\varepsilon_0} \left[ \frac{Q_1 Q_2}{r_{12}} + \frac{Q_1 Q_3}{r_{13}} + \frac{Q_2 Q_1}{r_{21}} + \frac{Q_2 Q_3}{r_{23}} + \frac{Q_3 Q_1}{r_{31}} +  \frac{Q_3 Q_2}{r_{32}}\right]$$

Finally, we get that the electrostatic potential energy stored in the system of three charges:

$$U_\mathrm{E} = \frac{1}{4\pi\varepsilon_0} \left[ \frac{Q_1 Q_2}{r_{12}} + \frac{Q_1 Q_3}{r_{13}} + \frac{Q_2 Q_3}{r_{23}}\right]$$

== Energy stored in an electrostatic field distribution in vacuum ==
The energy density, or energy per unit volume, $\frac{dU}{dV}$, of the electrostatic field of a continuous charge distribution is:
$$u_e = \frac{dU}{dV} = \frac{1}{2} \varepsilon_0 \left|{\mathbf{E}}\right|^2.$$

Outline of proof

One may take the equation for the electrostatic potential energy of a continuous charge distribution and put it in terms of the electrostatic field.

Since Gauss's law for electrostatic field in differential form states
$$\mathbf{\nabla}\cdot\mathbf{E} = \frac{\rho}{\varepsilon_0}$$
where

- $\mathbf{E}$ is the electric field vector
- $\rho$ is the total charge density including dipole charges bound in a material
- $dV$ is a volume element
- $\Phi$ is the electric potential
- $\varepsilon_0$ is the permittivity of free space,

then,
$$\begin{align}
U & = \frac{1}{2}\int \limits_{\text{all space}} \rho(r) \Phi(r) \, dV \\
& = \frac{1}{2}\int \limits_{\text{all space}} \varepsilon_0(\mathbf{\nabla}\cdot{\mathbf{E}})\Phi \, dV
\end{align}$$

so, now using the following divergence vector identity

$$\begin{align}
\nabla\cdot(\mathbf{A}{B}) &= (\nabla\cdot\mathbf{A}){B} + \mathbf{A}\cdot(\nabla{B}) \\
\Rightarrow (\nabla\cdot\mathbf{A}){B} &= \nabla\cdot(\mathbf{A}{B}) - \mathbf{A}\cdot(\nabla{B})
\end{align}$$

we have

$$U = \frac{\varepsilon_0}{2}\int \limits_{\text{all space}} \mathbf{\nabla}\cdot(\mathbf{E}\Phi) dV - \frac{\varepsilon_0}{2}\int \limits_{\text{all space}} (\mathbf{\nabla}\Phi)\cdot\mathbf{E} dV$$

using the divergence theorem and taking the area to be at infinity where $\Phi(\infty) = 0$, and using $\nabla \Phi = -\mathbf{E}$

$$\begin{align}
U & = \overbrace{\frac{\varepsilon_0}{2}\int\limits_{{}^\text{boundary}_\text{ of space}} \Phi\mathbf{E}\cdot d\mathbf A}^{0} - \frac{\varepsilon_0}{2}\int \limits_{\text{all space}} (-\mathbf{E})\cdot\mathbf{E} \, dV \\
& = \int \limits_{\text{all space}} \frac{1}{2}\varepsilon_0\left|{\mathbf{E}}\right|^2 \, dV.
\end{align}$$

So, the energy density, or energy per unit volume $\frac{dU}{dV}$ of the electrostatic field is:

$$u_e = \frac{1}{2} \varepsilon_0 \left|{\mathbf{E}}\right|^2.$$

== Energy stored in electronic elements ==
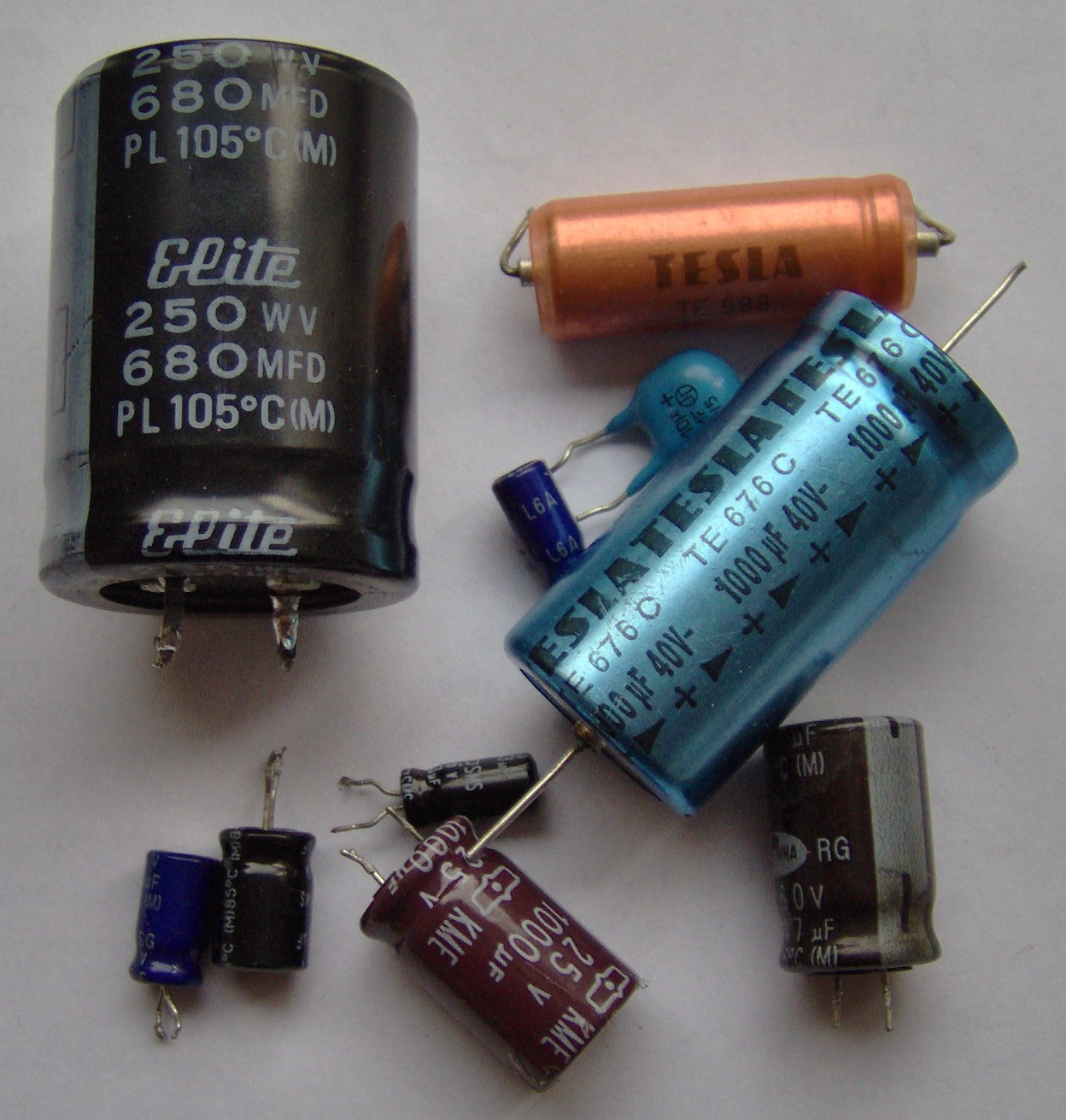
The electric potential energy stored in a capacitor is U_{E}=1/2 CV^{2}

Some elements in a circuit can convert energy from one form to another. For example, a resistor converts electrical energy to heat. This is known as the Joule effect. A capacitor stores it in its electric field. The total electrostatic potential energy stored in a capacitor is given by
$$U_E = \frac{1}{2}QV = \frac{1}{2} CV^2 = \frac{Q^2}{2C}$$
where C is the capacitance, V is the electric potential difference, and Q the charge stored in the capacitor.

Outline of proof

One may assemble charges to a capacitor in infinitesimal increments, $dq \to 0$, such that the amount of work done to assemble each increment to its final location may be expressed as

$$W_q = V \, dq = \frac{q}{C}dq.$$

The total work done to fully charge the capacitor in this way is then
$$W = \int dW = \int_0^Q V \, dq = \frac{1}{C} \int_0^Q q \, dq = \frac{Q^2}{2C}.$$
where $Q$ is the total charge on the capacitor. This work is stored as electrostatic potential energy, hence,
$$W = U_E = \frac{Q^2}{2C}.$$

Notably, this expression is only valid if $dq \to 0$, which holds for many-charge systems such as large capacitors having metallic electrodes. For few-charge systems the discrete nature of charge is important. The total energy stored in a few-charge capacitor is
$$U_E = \frac{Q^2}{2C}$$
which is obtained by a method of charge assembly utilizing the smallest physical charge increment $\Delta q = e$ where $e$ is the elementary unit of charge and $Q = Ne$ where $N$ is the total number of charges in the capacitor.

The total electrostatic potential energy may also be expressed in terms of the electric field in the form
$$U_E = \frac{1}{2} \int_V \mathbf{E} \cdot \mathbf{D} \, dV$$

where $\mathrm{D}$ is the electric displacement field within a dielectric material and integration is over the entire volume of the dielectric.

The total electrostatic potential energy stored within a charged dielectric may also be expressed in terms of a continuous volume charge, $\rho$,
$$U_E = \frac{1}{2} \int_V \rho \Phi \, dV$$
where integration is over the entire volume of the dielectric.
