= Scalar potential =

When potential energy difference depends only on displacement

Vector field (right) and corresponding scalar potential (left). If, for example, the scalar potential was the height of a hill as a function of location the vector field it describes is then the slope and direction (downward) for every given point.

In mathematical physics, a scalar potential is a scalar field used to describe a related vector field. (Here, the term field indicates that a quantity is a function of location.) See the figure to the right for an example of the relationship between a scalar potential and its related vector field. Scalar potentials are often easier to calculate than their associated vector field.

Vector fields that can be described by scalar potentials are called conservative and have certain properties similar to those of a conservative force in physics. Examples of vector fields that cannot be described by a scalar potential include magnetic fields and in fluid mechanics a solenoidal velocity field.

Scalar potentials play a prominent role in many areas of physics and engineering (the adjective scalar is sometimes omitted if there is no danger of confusion with vector potential). The gravitational potential is the scalar potential associated with the force of gravity per unit mass, or equivalently, the acceleration due to the gravitational field. In electrostatics, the electric potential is the scalar potential associated with the electric field. In fluid dynamics, irrotational lamellar fields have a scalar potential. Certain aspects of the nuclear force can be described by a Yukawa potential.

The scalar potential has a prominent role in advanced theories of physics such as Lagrangian and Hamiltonian formulations of classical mechanics. Further, the scalar potential is a fundamental quantity in quantum mechanics.

The scalar potential can be generalized by including a related vector potential. By the Helmholtz decomposition theorem, all vector fields can be describable in terms of a scalar potential and corresponding vector potential.

== Definition ==
Given a vector field F, the scalar potential P is defined such that:

$$\mathbf{F} = -\nabla P = - \left(
\frac{\partial P}{\partial x},
\frac{\partial P}{\partial y},
\frac{\partial P}{\partial z}
\right),$$

where ∇P is the gradient of P and the second part of the equation is minus the gradient for a function of the Cartesian coordinates x, y, z. (Note: The second part of this equation is only valid for Cartesian coordinates, other coordinate systems such as cylindrical or spherical coordinates will have more complicated representations, derived from the fundamental theorem of the gradient.) In some cases, mathematicians may use a positive sign in front of the gradient to define the potential. Because of this definition of P in terms of the gradient, the direction of F at any point is the direction of the steepest decrease of P at that point, its magnitude is the rate of that decrease per unit length.

Vector fields F that can be completely determined from a scalar potential using a gradient are by definition conservative vector fields. In order for a vector field, F, to be conservative it must satisfy the following equivalent statements:

- $-\int_a^b \mathbf{F}\cdot d\mathbf{l} = P(\mathbf{b})-P(\mathbf{a}),$ for every path from location a to location b and $P(b)$ is P evaluated at location b and $P(a)$ is P evaluated at location a ;
- $\oint \mathbf{F}\cdot d\mathbf{l} = 0,$ for every closed path;
- ${\nabla}\times{\mathbf{F}} = 0$ for every location.

The first of these conditions represents the fundamental theorem of the gradient and is true for any vector field that is a gradient of a differentiable single valued scalar field P. The second condition is a requirement of F so that it can be expressed as the gradient of a scalar function. The third condition re-expresses the second condition in terms of the curl of F using the fundamental theorem of the curl. A vector field F that satisfies these conditions is said to be irrotational (conservative).

If F is a conservative vector field (also called irrotational, curl-free, or potential), and its components have continuous partial derivatives, the potential of F with respect to a reference point r_{0} is defined in terms of the line integral:

$$P(\mathbf r) = -\int_C \mathbf{F}(\mathbf{r})\cdot\,d\mathbf{r} = -\int_a^b \mathbf{F}(\mathbf{r}(s))\cdot\mathbf{r}'(s)\,dt,$$

where C is a parametrized path from r_{0} to r,

$$\mathbf{r}(s), a\leq s\leq b, \mathbf{r}(a)=\mathbf{r_0}, \mathbf{r}(b)=\mathbf{r}.$$

The fact that the line integral depends on the path C only through its terminal points r_{0} and r is, in essence, the path independence property of a conservative vector field. The fundamental theorem of line integrals implies that if P is defined in this way, then F = –∇P, so that P is a scalar potential of the conservative vector field F. Scalar potential is not determined by the vector field alone: indeed, the gradient of a function is unaffected if a constant is added to it. If P is defined in terms of the line integral, the ambiguity of P reflects the freedom in the choice of the reference point r_{0}.

== Gravitational potential ==
Plot of a two-dimensional slice of the gravitational potential in and around a uniform spherical body. The inflection points of the cross-section are at the surface of the body.

The gravitational potential is a scalar potential associating with each point in space the work (energy transferred) per unit mass that would be needed to move an object to that point from a fixed reference point in the conservative gravitational field. It is analogous to the electric potential with mass playing the role of charge. The reference point, where the potential is zero, is by convention infinitely far away from any mass, resulting in a negative potential at any finite distance.

The gravitational potential V at a distance x from a point mass of mass M can be defined as the work W that needs to be done by an external agent to bring a unit mass in from infinity to that point:

$$V(\mathbf{x}) = \frac{W}{m} = \frac{1}{m} \int_{\infty}^{x} \mathbf{F} \left(\mathbf{x}'\right) \cdot d\mathbf{x}' = \frac{1}{m} \int_{\infty}^{x} \frac{G m M}{x'^2} dx' = -\frac{G M}{x},$$
where G is the gravitational constant, and F is the gravitational force. The product GM is the standard gravitational parameter and is often known to higher precision than G or M separately. The potential has units of energy per mass, e.g., J/kg in the MKS system. By convention, it is always negative where it is defined, and as x tends to infinity, it approaches zero. Near the surface of earth or any celestial body where the difference in distance from the center does not vary significantly with location, the gravitational potential can be simplified to being a linear function of the height (from a given altitude called the ground) such that:
$$V = g h,$$
where g is the local acceleration of gravity and h is the height difference from a given reference point called the ground. Near Earth's surface, the acceleration due to gravity, accurate to 2 significant figures, is 9.8 m/s^{2} (32 ft/s^{2}).

=== Altitude and gravitational potential energy ===
Care must be taken when calculating the gravitation field from the heights on an elevation contour map. The (nearly) uniform gravitational field near the Earth's surface does have a potential energy gravitational potential energy on a contour map is proportional to altitude:

$$U = m g h$$
where U is the gravitational potential energy and h is the height above the surface. But, the gradient of that contour is not the gravitational field. It has the correct slope and horizontal part of the direction. But its magnitude is only approximately the same as the gravitational field for small enough slopes. (To see this is the case imagine an infinite slope corresponding to a cliff. Here the gravitational field is g and not infinity as given by the gradient.)

On a contour map, the two-dimensional negative gradient of the altitude is a two-dimensional vector field, whose vectors are always perpendicular to the contours and also perpendicular to the direction of gravity. But on the hilly region represented by the contour map, the three-dimensional negative gradient of U always points straight downwards in the direction of gravity; F. However, a ball rolling down a hill cannot move directly downwards due to the normal force of the hill's surface, which cancels out the component of gravity perpendicular to the hill's surface. The component of gravity that remains to move the ball is parallel to the surface:
$$F_\mathrm{S} = - m g \ \sin \theta$$

where θ is the angle of inclination. Using a scalar potential V=gh does not produce this result instead:

$$-\nabla (gh) = -g \ \tan \theta, \hat{x},$$

where $-\hat{x}$ is the unit vector representing only the horizontal portion of the direction of the tangential force down the hill. Comparing the two results the magnitude of the force down the hill is related to the gradient by:
$$F_\mathrm{S} = \frac{mg |\nabla V|}{\sqrt{1+(\nabla V)^2}}.$$
These equations assume that the object is constrained by the ground, and therefore does not account for the possibility that an object might pick up enough speed/kinetic energy to be launched off of the ground. If this occurs the force will be entirely downwards (not parallel to the surface) and have a magnitude of F = mg.

It may happen that the quantity of interest is not the total force acting on the object (after subtracting out the normal component) but the horizontal component of F_{S}. This can happen for example when viewed only from above. The horizontal component of F_{S} is
$$\mathbf F_\mathrm{P} = - m g \ \sin \theta \ \cos \theta = - {1 \over 2} m g \sin 2 \theta.$$

This horizontal force F_{P} is greatest when θ is 45 degrees.

Let Δh be the uniform interval of altitude between contours on the contour map, and let Δx be the distance between two contours. Then

$$\theta = \tan^{-1}\frac{\Delta h}{\Delta x}$$

so that

$$F_P = - m g { \Delta x \, \Delta h \over \Delta x^2 + \Delta h^2 }.$$
When this is expressed in terms of the gradient it is:

$$F_\mathrm{P} = \frac{mg |\nabla V|}{1+(\nabla V)^2}.$$
However, on a contour map, the gradient is inversely proportional to Δx, which is not similar to force F_{P}: altitude on a contour map is not exactly a two-dimensional potential field. The magnitudes of forces are different, but the directions of the forces are the same on a contour map as well as on the hilly region of the Earth's surface represented by the contour map.

== Pressure as buoyant potential ==
In fluid mechanics, a fluid in equilibrium, but in the presence of a uniform gravitational field is permeated by a uniform buoyant force that cancels out the gravitational force: that is how the fluid maintains its equilibrium. This buoyant force is the negative gradient of pressure:

$$\mathbf{f_B} = - \nabla p.$$

Since buoyant force points upwards, in the direction opposite to gravity, then pressure in the fluid increases downwards. Pressure in a static body of water increases proportionally to the depth below the surface of the water. The surfaces of constant pressure are planes parallel to the surface, which can be characterized as the plane of zero pressure.

If the liquid has a vertical vortex (whose axis of rotation is perpendicular to the surface), then the vortex causes a depression in the pressure field. The surface of the liquid inside the vortex is pulled downwards as are any surfaces of equal pressure, which still remain parallel to the liquids surface. The effect is strongest inside the vortex and decreases rapidly with the distance from the vortex axis.

The buoyant force due to a fluid on a solid object immersed and surrounded by that fluid can be obtained by integrating the negative pressure gradient along the surface of the object:

$$F_B = - \oint_S \nabla p \cdot \, d\mathbf{S}.$$

== Scalar potential in Euclidean space ==
In 3-dimensional Euclidean space $\mathbb R^3$, the scalar potential of an irrotational vector field E is given by

$$\Phi(\mathbf{r}) = \frac{1}{4\pi} \int_{\mathbb R^3} \frac{\operatorname{div} \mathbf{E}(\mathbf{r}')}{\left\| \mathbf{r} - \mathbf{r}' \right\|} \, dV(\mathbf r')$$

where dV(r') is an infinitesimal volume element with respect to r'. Then

$$\mathbf{E} = -\mathbf{\nabla} \Phi = - \frac{1}{4\pi} \mathbf{\nabla} \int_{\mathbb R^3} \frac{\operatorname{div} \mathbf{E}(\mathbf{r}')}{\left\| \mathbf{r} - \mathbf{r}' \right\|} \, dV(\mathbf r')$$

This holds provided E is continuous and vanishes asymptotically to zero towards infinity, decaying faster than 1/r and if the divergence of E likewise vanishes towards infinity, decaying faster than 1/r^{2}.

Written another way, let

$$\Gamma(\mathbf{r}) = \frac{1}{4\pi} \frac{1}{\|\mathbf r\|}$$

be the Newtonian potential. This is the fundamental solution of the Laplace equation, meaning that the Laplacian of Γ is equal to the negative of the Dirac delta function:

$$\nabla^2\Gamma(\mathbf r) + \delta(\mathbf r) = 0.$$

Then the scalar potential is the divergence of the convolution of E with Γ:

$$\Phi = \operatorname{div}(\mathbf E * \Gamma).$$

Indeed, convolution of an irrotational vector field with a rotationally invariant potential is also irrotational. For an irrotational vector field G, it can be shown that

$$\nabla^2\mathbf{G} = \mathbf{\nabla}(\mathbf{\nabla} \cdot{} \mathbf{G}).$$

Hence

$$\nabla\operatorname{div}(\mathbf E * \Gamma) = \nabla^2(\mathbf E * \Gamma) = \mathbf E
* \nabla^2\Gamma = -\mathbf E * \delta = -\mathbf E$$

as required.

More generally, the formula

$$\Phi = \operatorname{div}(\mathbf E * \Gamma)$$

holds in n-dimensional Euclidean space (n > 2) with the Newtonian potential given then by

$$\Gamma(\mathbf r) = \frac{1}{n(n-2)\omega_n \|\mathbf r\|^{n-2}}$$

where ω_{n} is the volume of the unit n-ball. The proof is identical. Alternatively, integration by parts (or, more rigorously, the properties of convolution) gives

$$\Phi(\mathbf r) = -\frac{1}{n\omega_n} \int_{\mathbb R^n} \frac{\mathbf E(\mathbf r')\cdot (\mathbf r-\mathbf r')}{\|\mathbf r-\mathbf r'\|^n} \,dV(\mathbf r').$$

== See also ==
- Gradient theorem
- Fundamental theorem of vector analysis
- Equipotential (isopotential) lines and surfaces
