= Area theorem =

Area theorem may refer to:

- For Hawking's area theorem, see Black hole thermodynamics#Second law.
- For the area theorem in conformal mapping theory, see area theorem (conformal mapping).
