= Force field (physics) =

Region of space in which a force acts

Plot of a two-dimensional slice of the gravitational potential in and around a uniform spherical body. The inflection points of the cross-section are at the surface of the body.

In physics, a force field is a vector field corresponding with a non-contact force acting on a particle at various positions in space. Specifically, a force field is a vector field $\mathbf F$, where $\mathbf F(\mathbf r)$ is the force that a particle would feel if it were at the position $\mathbf r$.

== Examples ==
- Gravity is the force of attraction between two objects. A gravitational force field models this influence that a massive body (or more generally, any quantity of energy) extends into the space around itself. In Newtonian gravity, a particle of mass M creates a gravitational field $\mathbf g=\frac{-G M}{r^2}\hat\mathbf r$, where the radial unit vector $\hat\mathbf r$ points away from the particle. The gravitational force experienced by a particle of light mass m, close to the surface of Earth is given by $\mathbf F = m \mathbf g$, where g is Earth's gravity.
- An electric field $\mathbf E$ exerts a force on a point charge q, given by $\mathbf F = q\mathbf E$.
- In a magnetic field $\mathbf B$, a point charge moving through it experiences a force perpendicular to its own velocity and to the direction of the field, following the relation: $\mathbf F = q\mathbf v\times\mathbf B$.

== Work ==
Work is dependent on the displacement as well as the force acting on an object. As a particle moves through a force field along a path C, the work done by the force is a line integral:
$$W = \int_C \mathbf F \cdot d\mathbf r$$

This value is independent of the velocity/momentum that the particle travels along the path.

=== Conservative force field ===
For a conservative force field, it is also independent of the path itself, depending only on the starting and ending points. Therefore, the work for an object travelling in a closed path is zero, since its starting and ending points are the same:

$$\oint_C \mathbf F \cdot d\mathbf r = 0$$
If the field is conservative, the work done can be more easily evaluated by realizing that a conservative vector field can be written as the gradient of some scalar potential function:

$$\mathbf F = -\nabla \phi$$

The work done is then simply the difference in the value of this potential in the starting and end points of the path. If these points are given by x = a and x = b, respectively:

$$W = \phi(b) - \phi(a)$$

== See also ==
- Classical mechanics
- Field line
- Force
- Mechanical work
