= Conservative force =

Force in which the work done in moving an object depends only on its displacement

In physics, a conservative force is a force with the property that the total work done by the force in moving a particle between two points is independent of the path taken. Equivalently, if a particle travels in a closed loop, the total work done (the sum of the force acting along the path multiplied by the displacement) by a conservative force is zero.

A conservative force depends only on the position of the object. If a force is conservative, it is possible to assign a numerical value for the potential at any point and conversely, when an object moves from one location to another, the force changes the potential energy of the object by an amount that does not depend on the path taken, contributing to the mechanical energy and the overall conservation of energy. If the force is not conservative, then defining a scalar potential is not possible, because taking different paths would lead to conflicting potential differences between the start and end points.

Gravitational force is an example of a conservative force, while frictional force is an example of a non-conservative force.

Other examples of conservative forces are: force in elastic spring, force due to liquid pressure acting on a surface, electrostatic force between two electric charges, and magnetic force between two magnetic poles. The last two forces are called central forces as they act along the line joining the centres of two charged/magnetized bodies. A central force is conservative if and only if it is spherically symmetric.

For conservative forces,

$\mathbf{F_c} = - \frac{\textit{dU}}{d\mathbf{s}}$

where $F_c$ is the conservative force, $U$ is the potential energy, and $s$ is the position.

== Informal definition ==
Informally, a conservative force can be thought of as a force that conserves mechanical energy. Suppose a particle starts at point A, and there is a force F acting on it. Then the particle is moved around by other forces, and eventually ends up at A again. Though the particle may still be moving, at that instant when it passes point A again, it has traveled a closed path. If the net work done by F at this point is 0, then F passes the closed path test. Any force that passes the closed path test for all possible closed paths is classified as a conservative force.

The gravitational force, spring force, magnetic force (according to some definitions, see below) and electric force (at least in a time-independent magnetic field, see Faraday's law of induction for details) are examples of conservative forces, while friction and air drag are classical examples of non-conservative forces.

For non-conservative forces, the mechanical energy that is lost (not conserved) has to go somewhere else, by conservation of energy. Usually the energy is turned into heat, for example the heat generated by friction. In addition to heat, friction also often produces some sound energy. The water drag on a moving boat converts the boat's mechanical energy into not only heat and sound energy, but also wave energy at the edges of its wake. These and other energy losses are irreversible because of the second law of thermodynamics.

== Path independence ==

A direct consequence of the closed path test is that the work done by a conservative force on a particle moving between any two points does not depend on the path taken by the particle.

This is illustrated in the figure to the right: The work done by the gravitational force on an object depends only on its change in height because the gravitational force is conservative. The work done by a conservative force is equal to the negative of change in potential energy during that process. For a proof, imagine two paths 1 and 2, both going from point A to point B. The variation of energy for the particle, taking path 1 from A to B and then path 2 backwards from B to A, is 0; thus, the work is the same in path 1 and 2, i.e., the work is independent of the path followed, as long as it goes from A to B.

For example, if a child slides down a frictionless slide, the work done by the gravitational force on the child from the start of the slide to the end is independent of the shape of the slide; it only depends on the vertical displacement of the child.

== Mathematical description ==
A force field F, defined everywhere in space (or within a simply-connected volume of space), is called a conservative force or conservative vector field if it meets any of these three equivalent conditions:

1. The curl of F is the zero vector:
  $$\mathbf{\nabla} \times \mathbf{F} = \mathbf{0}.$$
  where in two dimensions this reduces to:
  $$\frac{\partial F_y}{\partial x} - \frac{\partial F_x}{\partial y} = 0$$
2. There is zero net work (W) done by the force when moving a particle through a trajectory that starts and ends in the same place:
  $$W \equiv \oint_C \mathbf{F} \cdot \mathrm{d}\mathbf r = 0.$$
3. The force can be written as the negative gradient of a potential, $\Phi$:
  $$\mathbf{F} = -\mathbf{\nabla} \Phi.$$
Proof that these three conditions are equivalent when F is a force field

1 implies 2
Let C be any simple closed path (i.e., a path that starts and ends at the same point and has no self-intersections), and consider a surface S of which C is the boundary. Then Stokes' theorem says that
$$\int_S \left(\mathbf{\nabla} \times \mathbf{F}\right) \cdot \mathrm{d}\mathbf{a} = \oint_C \mathbf{F} \cdot \mathrm{d}\mathbf{r}$$
If the curl of F is zero the left hand side is zero – therefore statement 2 is true.
2 implies 3
Assume that statement 2 holds. Let c be a simple curve from the origin to a point $x$ and define a function
$$\Phi(x) = -\int_c \mathbf{F} \cdot \mathrm{d}\mathbf{r}.$$
The fact that this function is well-defined (independent of the choice of c) follows from statement 2. Anyway, from the fundamental theorem of calculus, it follows that
$$\mathbf{F} = -\mathbf{\nabla} \Phi .$$
So statement 2 implies statement 3 (see full proof).
3 implies 1
Finally, assume that the third statement is true. A well-known vector calculus identity states that the curl of the gradient of any function is 0. (See proof.) Therefore, if the third statement is true, then the first statement must be true as well. This shows that statement 1 implies 2, 2 implies 3, and 3 implies 1. Therefore, all three are equivalent, Q.E.D. (The equivalence of 1 and 3 is also known as (one aspect of) Helmholtz's theorem.)

The term conservative force comes from the fact that when a conservative force exists, it conserves mechanical energy. The most familiar conservative forces are gravity, the electric force (in a time-independent magnetic field, see Faraday's law), and spring force.

Many forces (particularly those that depend on velocity) are not force fields. In these cases, the above three conditions are not mathematically equivalent. For example, the magnetic force satisfies condition 2 (since the work done by a magnetic field on a charged particle is always zero), but does not satisfy condition 3, and condition 1 is not even defined (the force is not a vector field, so one cannot evaluate its curl). Accordingly, some authors classify the magnetic force as conservative, while others do not. The magnetic force is an unusual case; most velocity-dependent forces, such as friction, do not satisfy any of the three conditions, and therefore are unambiguously nonconservative.

== Non-conservative force ==
Despite conservation of total energy, non-conservative forces can arise in classical physics due to neglected degrees of freedom or from time-dependent potentials. Many non-conservative forces may be perceived as macroscopic effects of small-scale conservative forces. For instance, friction may be treated without violating conservation of energy by considering the motion of individual molecules; however, that means every molecule's motion must be considered rather than handling it through statistical methods. For macroscopic systems the non-conservative approximation is far easier to deal with than millions of degrees of freedom.

Examples of non-conservative forces are friction and non-elastic material stress. Friction has the effect of transferring some of the energy from the large-scale motion of the bodies to small-scale movements in their interior, and therefore appear non-conservative on a large scale. General relativity is non-conservative, as seen in the anomalous precession of Mercury's orbit. However, general relativity does conserve a stress–energy–momentum pseudotensor.

== See also ==
- Conservative vector field
- Conservative system
