= Area theorem (conformal mapping) =

In the mathematical theory of conformal mappings, the area theorem gives an inequality satisfied by the power series coefficients of certain conformal mappings. The theorem is called by that name, not because of its implications, but rather because the proof uses the notion of area.

== Statement ==
Suppose that $f$ is analytic and injective in the punctured open unit disk $\mathbb D\setminus\{0\}$ and has the power series representation

$$f(z)= \frac 1z + \sum_{n=0}^\infty a_n z^n,\qquad z\in \mathbb D\setminus\{0\},$$

then the coefficients $a_n$ satisfy

$$\sum_{n=0}^\infty n|a_n|^2\le 1.$$

== Proof ==
The idea of the proof is to look at the area uncovered by the image of $f$. Define for $r\in(0,1)$

$$\gamma_r(\theta):=f(r\,e^{-i\theta}),\qquad \theta\in[0,2\pi].$$

Then $\gamma_r$ is a simple closed curve in the plane. Let $D_r$ denote the unique bounded connected component of $\mathbb C\setminus\gamma_r([0,2\pi])$. The existence and uniqueness of $D_r$ follows from Jordan's curve theorem.

If $D$ is a domain in the plane whose boundary is a smooth simple closed curve $\gamma$, then

$$\mathrm{area}(D)=\int_\gamma x\,dy=-\int_\gamma y\,dx\,,$$

provided that $\gamma$ is positively oriented around $D$. This follows easily, for example, from Green's theorem. As we will soon see, $\gamma_r$ is positively oriented around $D_r$ (and that is the reason for the minus sign in the definition of $\gamma_r$). After applying the chain rule and the formula for $\gamma_r$, the above expressions for the area give

$$\mathrm{area}(D_r)= \int_0^{2\pi} \Re\bigl(f(r e^{-i\theta})\bigr)\,\Im\bigl(-i\,r\,e^{-i\theta}\,f'(r e^{-i\theta})\bigr)\,d\theta = -\int_0^{2\pi} \Im\bigl(f(r e^{-i\theta})\bigr)\,\Re\bigl(-i\,r\,e^{-i\theta}\,f'(r e^{-i\theta})\bigr)d\theta.$$

Therefore, the area of $D_r$ also equals to the average of the two expressions on the right hand side. After simplification, this yields

$$\mathrm{area}(D_r) = -\frac 12\, \Re\int_0^{2\pi}f(r\,e^{-i\theta})\,\overline{r\,e^{-i\theta}\,f'(r\,e^{-i\theta})}\,d\theta,$$

where $\overline z$ denotes complex conjugation. We set $a_{-1}=1$ and use the power series expansion for $f$, to get

$$\mathrm{area}(D_r) = -\frac 12\, \Re\int_0^{2\pi} \sum_{n=-1}^\infty
\sum_{m=-1}^\infty
m\,r^{n+m}\,a_n\,\overline{a_m}\,e^{i\,(m-n)\,\theta}\,d\theta\,.$$

(Since $\int_0^{2\pi} \sum_{n=-1}^\infty\sum_{m=-1}^\infty m\,r^{n+m}\,|a_n|\,|a_m|\,d\theta<\infty\,,$ the rearrangement of the terms is justified.) Now note that $\int_0^{2\pi} e^{i\,(m-n)\,\theta}\,d\theta$ is $2\pi$ if $n= m$ and is zero otherwise. Therefore, we get

$$\mathrm{area}(D_r)= -\pi\sum_{n=-1}^\infty n\,r^{2n}\,|a_n|^2.$$

The area of $D_r$ is clearly positive. Therefore, the right hand side is positive. Since $a_{-1}=1$, by letting $r\to1$, the theorem now follows.

It only remains to justify the claim that $\gamma_r$ is positively oriented around $D_r$. Let $r'$ satisfy $r<r'<1$, and set $z_0=f(r')$, say. For very small $s>0$, we may write the expression for the winding number of $\gamma_s$ around $z_0$, and verify that it is equal to $1$. Since, $\gamma_t$ does not pass through $z_0$ when $t\ne r'$ (as $f$ is injective), the invariance of the winding number under homotopy in the complement of $z_0$ implies that the winding number of $\gamma_r$ around $z_0$ is also $1$. This implies that $z_0\in D_r$ and that $\gamma_r$ is positively oriented around $D_r$, as required.

== Uses ==
The inequalities satisfied by power series coefficients of conformal mappings were of considerable interest to mathematicians prior to the solution of the Bieberbach conjecture. The area theorem is a central tool in this context. Moreover, the area theorem is often used in order to prove the Koebe 1/4 theorem, which is very useful in the study of the geometry of conformal mappings.
