= Point particle =

Idealised model of a particle in physics

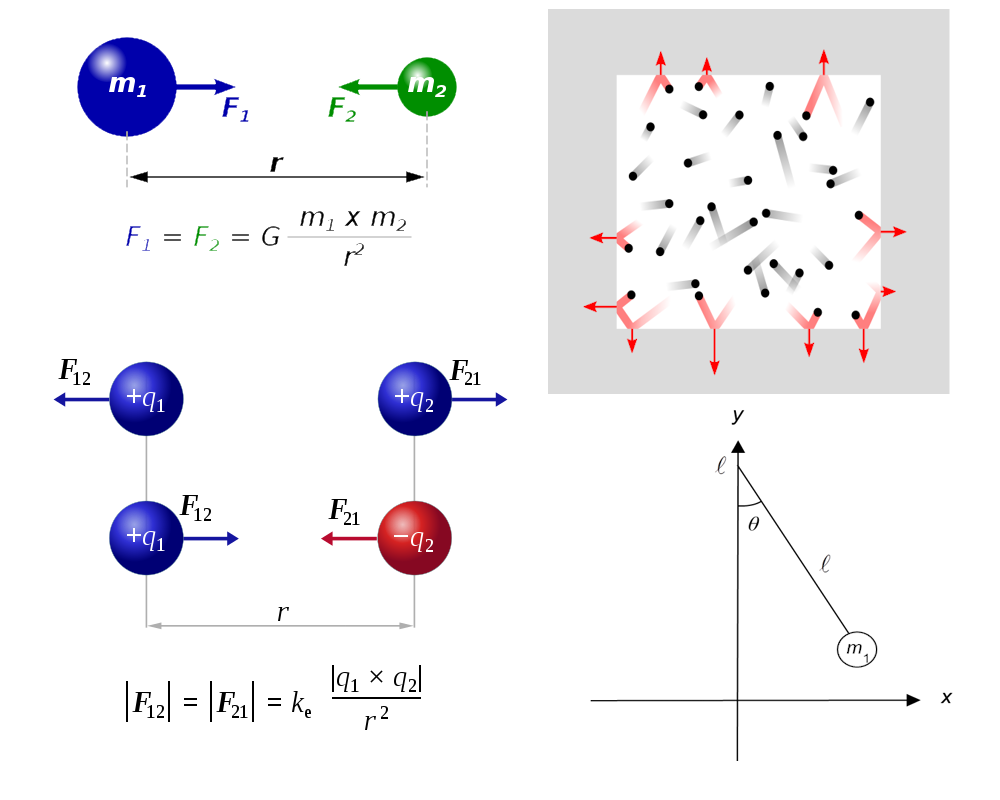
Examples of point particles: (counterclockwise from top left) point mass for Newton's law of universal gravitation, point particles to measure distance between two charged particles, simple pendulum (point mass attached to the end of a massless string), ideal gas particles devoid of interactions (no collisions, gravitational force, or Coulomb's force between particles)

A point particle, ideal particle or point-like particle (or pointlike particle) is an idealization used in physics. Its defining feature is negligible spatial extension or a body whose own rotation is irrelevant. A point particle is an appropriate representation of any object whenever its size, shape, and structure are irrelevant in a given context. For example, from far enough away, any finite-size object will look and behave as a point-like object. Point masses and point charges are two common cases. When a point particle has an additive property, such as mass or charge, it is often represented mathematically by a Dirac delta function. In classical mechanics there is usually no concept of rotation of point particles about their "center".

In quantum mechanics, the concept of a point particle is complicated by the Heisenberg uncertainty principle, because even an elementary particle, with no known internal structure, occupies a nonzero volume. There is nevertheless a distinction between elementary particles such as electrons or quarks, which have no known internal structure, and composite particles such as protons and neutrons, whose internal structures are made up of quarks. Elementary particles are sometimes called "point particles" in reference to their lack of known internal structure, but this is in a different sense than that discussed herein.

== Point mass ==
Point mass (pointlike mass) is the concept, for example in classical physics, of a physical object (typically matter) that has nonzero mass, and yet explicitly and specifically is (or is being thought of or modeled as) infinitesimal (infinitely small) in its volume or linear dimensions. In the theory of gravity, extended objects can behave as point-like masses even in their immediate vicinity. For example, spherical objects interacting in 3-dimensional space whose interactions are described by the Newtonian gravitation behave, as long as they do not touch each other, in such a way as if all their matter were concentrated in their centers of mass. In fact, this is true for all fields described by an inverse square law.

== Point charge ==
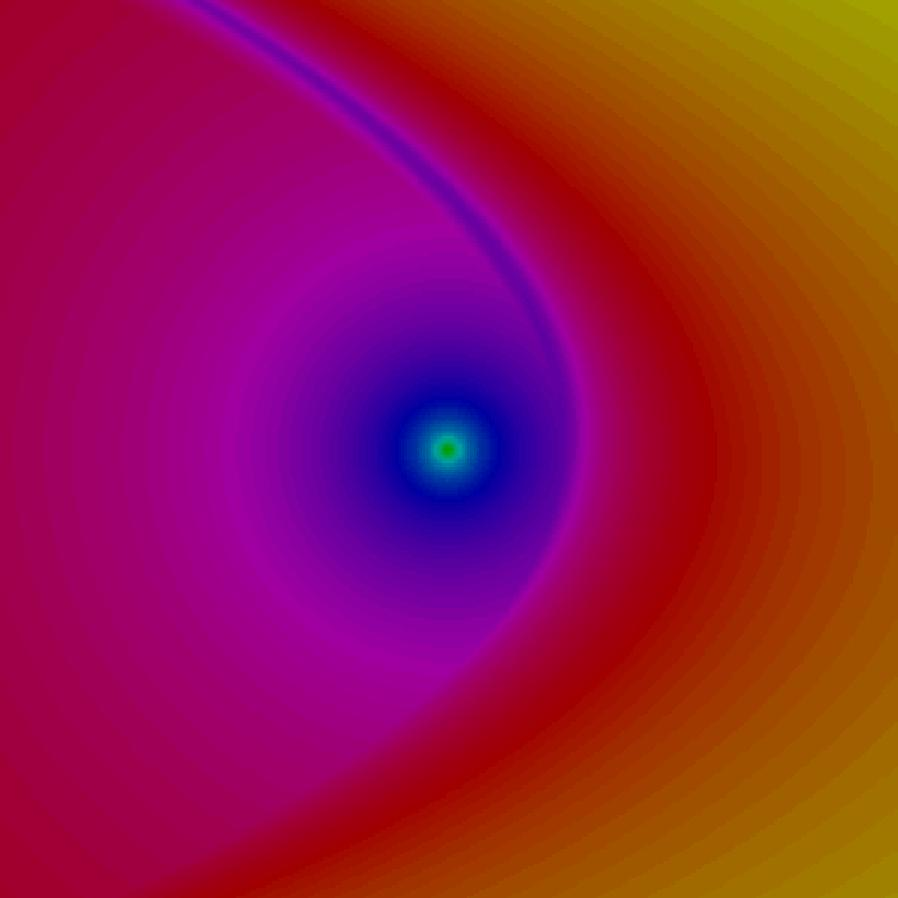
Scalar potential of a point charge shortly after exiting a dipole magnet, moving left to right.

In electromagnetism, a point charge is a point particle with a nonzero electric charge. It can also be defined as a charged body or charge carrier whose effective diameter is much smaller than the distance to another charged object. The fundamental equation of electrostatics is Coulomb's law, which describes the electric force between two point charges. Another result, Earnshaw's theorem, states that a collection of point charges cannot be maintained in a static equilibrium configuration solely by the electrostatic interaction of the charges. The electric field associated with a classical point charge increases to infinity as the distance from the point charge decreases towards zero, which indicates that the model is no longer accurate in this limit.

== In quantum mechanics ==
A proton is a combination of two up quarks and one down quark, held together by gluons.

In quantum mechanics, there is a distinction between an elementary particle (also called "point particle") and a composite particle. An elementary particle, such as an electron, quark, or photon, is a particle with no known internal structure. Whereas a composite particle, such as a proton or neutron, has an internal structure. However, neither elementary nor composite particles are spatially localized, because of the Heisenberg uncertainty principle. The particle wavepacket always occupies a nonzero volume. For example, see atomic orbital: The electron is an elementary particle, but its quantum states form three-dimensional patterns.

Nevertheless, there is good reason that an elementary particle is often called a point particle. Even if an elementary particle has a delocalized wavepacket, the wavepacket can be represented as a quantum superposition of quantum states wherein the particle is exactly localized. Moreover, the interactions of the particle can be represented as a superposition of interactions of individual states which are localized. This is not true for a composite particle, which can never be represented as a superposition of exactly-localized quantum states. It is in this sense that physicists can discuss the intrinsic "size" of a particle: The size of its internal structure, not the size of its wavepacket.

For example, for the electron, experimental evidence shows that the size of an electron is less than 10^{−18} m. (This should not be confused with the classical electron radius, which, despite the name, is unrelated to the actual size of an electron.)

== See also ==
- Test particle
- Brane
- Charge (physics) (general concept, not limited to electric charge)
- Standard Model of particle physics
- Wave–particle duality

== Notes and references ==
=== Bibliography ===
- C. Quigg (2009). "Particle, Elementary". Encyclopedia Americana. Grolier Online. Archived from the original on 2013-04-01.
- S. L. Glashow (2009). "Quark". Encyclopedia Americana. Grolier Online. Archived from the original on 2013-04-01.
- M. Alonso; E. J. Finn (1968). Fundamental University Physics Volume III: Quantum and Statistical Physics. Addison-Wesley. ISBN 0-201-00262-0.
