= Vector fields in cylindrical and spherical coordinates =

Vector field representation in 3D curvilinear coordinate systems

In vector calculus and physics, a vector field is an assignment of a vector to each point in a space. When these spaces are in (typically) three dimensions, then the use of cylindrical or spherical coordinates to represent the position of objects in this space is useful in connection with objects and phenomena that have some rotational symmetry about the longitudinal axis, such as water flow in a straight pipe with round cross-section, heat distribution in a metal cylinder, electromagnetic fields produced by an electric current in a long, straight wire, accretion disks in astronomy, and so on. The mathematical properties of such vector fields are thus of interest to physicists and mathematicians alike, who study them to model systems arising in the natural world.

Spherical coordinates (r, θ, φ) as commonly used in physics: radial distance r, polar angle θ (theta), and azimuthal angle φ (phi). The symbol ρ (rho) is often used instead of r.

Note: This page uses common physics notation for spherical coordinates, in which $\theta$ is the angle between the $z$ axis and the radius vector $r$ connecting the origin to the point in question, while $\phi$ is the angle between the projection of the radius vector onto the $x - y$ plane and the $x$ axis. Several other definitions are in use, and so care must be taken in comparing different sources.

== Cylindrical coordinate system ==
=== Vector fields ===
Vectors are defined in cylindrical coordinates by (ρ, φ, z), where

- ρ is the length of the vector projected onto the xy-plane,
- φ is the angle between the projection of the vector onto the xy-plane (i.e. ρ) and the positive x-axis (0 ≤ φ < 2π),
- z is the regular z-coordinate.

(ρ, φ, z) is given in Cartesian coordinates by:

$$\begin{bmatrix} \rho \\ \phi \\ z \end{bmatrix} =
\begin{bmatrix}
\sqrt{x^2 + y^2} \\ \operatorname{arctan}(y / x) \\ z
\end{bmatrix},\ \ \ 0 \le \phi < 2\pi,$$

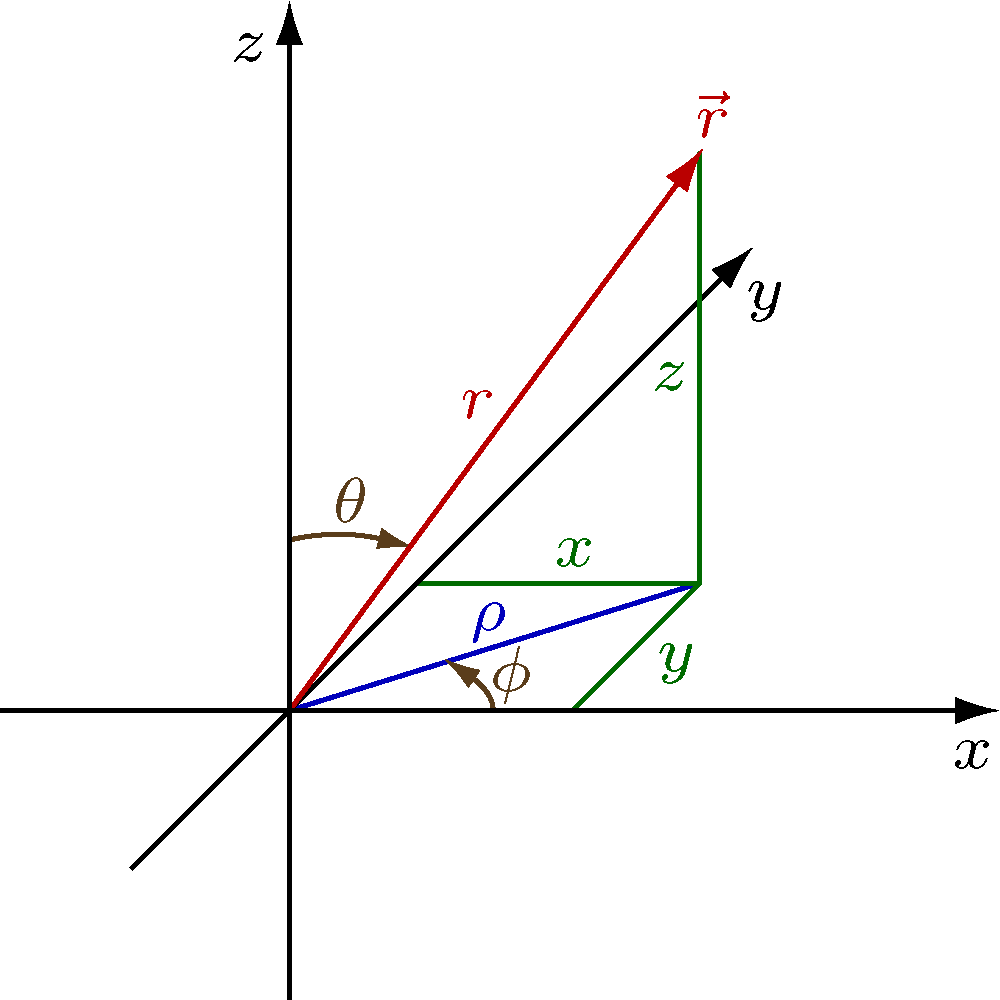

or inversely by:
$$\begin{bmatrix} x \\ y \\ z \end{bmatrix} =
\begin{bmatrix} \rho\cos\phi \\ \rho\sin\phi \\ z \end{bmatrix}.$$

Any vector field can be written in terms of the unit vectors as:
$$\mathbf A
= A_x \mathbf{\hat x} + A_y \mathbf{\hat y} + A_z \mathbf{\hat z}
= A_\rho \boldsymbol{\hat \rho} + A_\phi \boldsymbol{\hat \phi} + A_z \mathbf{\hat z}$$
The cylindrical unit vectors are related to the Cartesian unit vectors by:
$$\begin{bmatrix}\boldsymbol{\hat \rho} \\ \boldsymbol{\hat\phi} \\ \mathbf{\hat z}\end{bmatrix}
= \begin{bmatrix}
\cos\phi & \sin\phi & 0 \\
-\sin\phi & \cos\phi & 0 \\
0 & 0 & 1
\end{bmatrix}
\begin{bmatrix} \mathbf{\hat x} \\ \mathbf{\hat y} \\ \mathbf{\hat z} \end{bmatrix}$$

Note: the matrix is an orthogonal matrix, that is, its inverse is simply its transpose:

$$\begin{bmatrix} \mathbf{\hat x} \\ \mathbf{\hat y} \\ \mathbf{\hat z} \end{bmatrix}
= \begin{bmatrix}
\cos\phi & -\sin\phi & 0 \\
\sin\phi & \cos\phi & 0 \\
0 & 0 & 1
\end{bmatrix}
\begin{bmatrix}\boldsymbol{\hat \rho} \\ \boldsymbol{\hat\phi} \\ \mathbf{\hat z}\end{bmatrix}$$

=== Time derivative of a vector field ===
To find out how the vector field A changes in time, the time derivatives should be calculated. For this purpose Newton's notation will be used for the time derivative ($\dot{\mathbf{A}}$). In Cartesian coordinates this is simply:
$$\dot{\mathbf{A}} = \dot{A}_x \hat{\mathbf{x}} + \dot{A}_y \hat{\mathbf{y}} + \dot{A}_z \hat{\mathbf{z}}$$
However, in cylindrical coordinates this becomes:
$$\dot{\mathbf{A}} = \dot{A}_\rho \hat{\boldsymbol{\rho}} + A_\rho \dot{\hat{\boldsymbol{\rho}}}
+ \dot{A}_\phi \hat{\boldsymbol{\phi}} + A_\phi \dot{\hat{\boldsymbol{\phi}}}
+ \dot{A}_z \hat{\boldsymbol{z}} + A_z \dot{\hat{\boldsymbol{z}}}$$
The time derivatives of the unit vectors are needed. They are given by:
$$\begin{align}
\dot{\hat{\boldsymbol{\rho}}} & = \dot{\phi} \hat{\boldsymbol{\phi}} \\
\dot{\hat{\boldsymbol{\phi}}} & = - \dot\phi \hat{\boldsymbol{\rho}} \\
\dot{\hat{\mathbf{z}}} & = 0
\end{align}$$
So the time derivative simplifies to:
$$\dot{\mathbf{A}}
= \hat{\boldsymbol{\rho}} \left(\dot{A}_\rho - A_\phi \dot{\phi}\right)
+ \hat{\boldsymbol{\phi}} \left(\dot{A}_\phi + A_\rho \dot{\phi}\right)
+ \hat{\mathbf{z}} \dot{A}_z$$

=== Second time derivative of a vector field ===
The second time derivative is of interest in physics, as it is found in equations of motion for classical mechanical systems. The second time derivative of a vector field in cylindrical coordinates is given by:
$$\ddot{\mathbf{A}}
= \mathbf{\hat \rho} \left(\ddot A_\rho - A_\phi \ddot\phi - 2 \dot A_\phi \dot\phi - A_\rho \dot\phi^2\right)
+ \boldsymbol{\hat\phi} \left(\ddot A_\phi + A_\rho \ddot\phi + 2 \dot A_\rho \dot\phi - A_\phi \dot\phi^2\right)
+ \mathbf{\hat z} \ddot A_z$$
To understand this expression, A is substituted for P, where P is the vector (ρ, φ, z).

This means that $\mathbf{A} = \mathbf{P} = \rho \mathbf{\hat \rho} + z \mathbf{\hat z}$.

After substituting, the result is given:
$$\ddot\mathbf{P}
= \mathbf{\hat \rho} \left(\ddot \rho - \rho \dot\phi^2\right)
+ \boldsymbol{\hat\phi} \left(\rho \ddot\phi + 2 \dot \rho \dot\phi\right)
+ \mathbf{\hat z} \ddot z$$
In mechanics, the terms of this expression are called.

$\ddot \rho \mathbf{\hat \rho}$	central outward acceleration
$-\rho \dot\phi^2 \mathbf{\hat \rho}$	centripetal acceleration
$\rho \ddot\phi \boldsymbol{\hat\phi}$	angular acceleration
$2 \dot \rho \dot\phi \boldsymbol{\hat\phi}$	Coriolis effect
$\ddot z \mathbf{\hat z}$	z-acceleration

== Spherical coordinate system ==
=== Vector fields ===
Vectors are defined in spherical coordinates by (r, θ, φ), where

- r is the length of the vector,
- θ is the angle between the positive Z-axis and the vector in question (0 ≤ θ ≤ π), and
- φ is the angle between the projection of the vector onto the xy-plane and the positive X-axis (0 ≤ φ < 2π).

(r, θ, φ) is given in Cartesian coordinates by:
$$\begin{bmatrix}r \\ \theta \\ \phi \end{bmatrix} =
\begin{bmatrix}
\sqrt{x^2 + y^2 + z^2} \\ \arccos(z / \sqrt{x^2 + y^2 + z^2}) \\ \arctan(y / x)
\end{bmatrix},\ \ \ 0 \le \theta \le \pi,\ \ \ 0 \le \phi < 2\pi,$$
or inversely by:
$$\begin{bmatrix} x \\ y \\ z \end{bmatrix} =
\begin{bmatrix} r\sin\theta\cos\phi \\ r\sin\theta\sin\phi \\ r\cos\theta\end{bmatrix}.$$

Any vector field can be written in terms of the unit vectors as:
$$\mathbf A
= A_x\mathbf{\hat x} + A_y\mathbf{\hat y} + A_z\mathbf{\hat z}
= A_r\boldsymbol{\hat r} + A_\theta\boldsymbol{\hat \theta} + A_\phi\boldsymbol{\hat \phi}$$

The derivative of spherical basis coordinates are related to the derivative of Cartesian basis coordinates by the Jacobian matrix:

$$\begin{bmatrix} d\mathbf{x} \\ d\mathbf{y} \\ d\mathbf{z} \end{bmatrix}
= \begin{bmatrix} \frac{\partial x}{\partial r} & \frac{\partial x}{\partial \theta} & \frac{\partial x}{\partial \phi} \\
\frac{\partial y}{\partial r} & \frac{\partial y}{\partial \theta} & \frac{\partial y}{\partial \phi} \\
\frac{\partial z}{\partial r} & \frac{\partial z}{\partial \theta}  & \frac{\partial z}{\partial \phi} \end{bmatrix}
\begin{bmatrix} d\boldsymbol{r} \\ d\boldsymbol{\theta}  \\  d\boldsymbol{\phi} \end{bmatrix}$$

Normalizing the Jacobian matrix so that the spherical basis vectors have unit length we get:

$$\begin{bmatrix}\mathbf{\hat x} \\ \mathbf{\hat y}  \\ \mathbf{\hat z} \end{bmatrix}
= \begin{bmatrix} \sin\theta\cos\phi & \cos\theta\cos\phi & -\sin\phi \\
\sin\theta\sin\phi & \cos\theta\sin\phi &  \cos\phi \\
\cos\theta         & -\sin\theta        & 0 \end{bmatrix}
\begin{bmatrix} \boldsymbol{\hat{r}} \\ \boldsymbol{\hat\theta} \\ \boldsymbol{\hat\phi} \end{bmatrix}$$

Proof

$$\mathrm{d}\mathbf{r} =
\sum_i \frac{\partial \mathbf{r}}{\partial x_i} \,\mathrm{d}x_i =
\sum_i \left|\frac{\partial \mathbf{r}}{\partial x_i}\right|
\frac{\frac{\partial \mathbf{r}}{\partial x_i}}{\left|\frac{\partial \mathbf{r}}{\partial x_i}\right|} \, \mathrm{d}x_i =
\sum_i \left|\frac{\partial \mathbf{r}}{\partial x_i}\right| \,\mathrm{d}x_i \, \hat{\boldsymbol{x}}_i,$$
that is, the change in $\mathbf r$ is decomposed into individual changes corresponding to changes in the individual coordinates.

To apply this to the present case, one needs to calculate how $\mathbf r$ changes with each of the coordinates. In the conventions used,
$$\mathbf{r} = \begin{bmatrix}
r \sin\theta \, \cos\phi \\
r \sin\theta \, \sin\phi \\
r \cos\theta
\end{bmatrix},
x_1=r, x_2=\theta, x_3=\phi.$$

Thus,
$$\frac{\partial\mathbf r}{\partial r} = \begin{bmatrix}
\sin\theta \, \cos\phi \\
\sin\theta \, \sin\phi \\
\cos\theta
\end{bmatrix}=\mathbf{\hat r}, \quad
\frac{\partial\mathbf r}{\partial \theta} = \begin{bmatrix}
r \cos\theta \, \cos\phi \\
r \cos\theta \, \sin\phi \\
-r \sin\theta
\end{bmatrix}=r\,\hat{\boldsymbol\theta }, \quad
\frac{\partial\mathbf r}{\partial \phi} = \begin{bmatrix}
-r \sin\theta \, \sin\phi \\
\hphantom{-}r \sin\theta \, \cos\phi \\
0
\end{bmatrix}
=
r \sin\theta\,\mathbf{\hat{\boldsymbol\phi}}  .$$

The desired coefficients are the magnitudes of these vectors:
$$\left|\frac{\partial\mathbf r}{\partial r}\right| = 1, \quad
\left|\frac{\partial\mathbf r}{\partial \theta}\right| = r, \quad
\left|\frac{\partial\mathbf r}{\partial \phi}\right| = r \sin\theta.$$

$$\begin{bmatrix} d\mathbf{r_x} \\ d\mathbf{r_y} \\ d\mathbf{r_z} \end{bmatrix}
= \begin{bmatrix}1\cdot d\mathbf{\hat x} \\ 1\cdot d\mathbf{\hat y}  \\ 1\cdot d\mathbf{\hat z} \end{bmatrix}
= \begin{bmatrix}
\sin\theta\cos\phi & r\cos\theta\cos\phi & -r\sin\theta\sin\phi\\
\sin\theta\sin\phi & r\cos\theta\sin\phi & \hphantom{-}r\sin\theta\cos\phi\\
\cos\theta & -r\sin\theta & \hphantom{-}0
\end{bmatrix}
\begin{bmatrix} dr \\ d{\theta}  \\  d{\phi} \end{bmatrix}
= \begin{bmatrix} \sin\theta\cos\phi & \cos\theta\cos\phi & -\sin\phi \\
\sin\theta\sin\phi & \cos\theta\sin\phi &  \cos\phi \\
\cos\theta         & -\sin\theta        & 0 \end{bmatrix}
\begin{bmatrix} 1\cdot dr \\ r\cdot d{\theta} \\ r\sin\theta \cdot d{\phi}\end{bmatrix}$$

the last matrix is
$$\begin{bmatrix} d\boldsymbol{\hat{r}} \\ d\boldsymbol{\hat\theta} \\ d\boldsymbol{\hat\phi} \end{bmatrix}$$

q.e.d.

see other detail in Spherical_coordinate_system#Integration_and_differentiation_in_spherical_coordinates

Note: the matrix is an orthogonal matrix, that is, its inverse is simply its transpose:

$$\begin{bmatrix} \boldsymbol{\hat{r}} \\ \boldsymbol{\hat\theta} \\ \boldsymbol{\hat\phi} \end{bmatrix}
= \begin{bmatrix} \sin\theta\cos\phi & \sin\theta\sin\phi & \cos\theta\ \\
\cos\theta\cos\phi & \cos\theta\sin\phi &  -\sin\theta\ \\
-\sin\phi      &  \cos\phi        & 0 \end{bmatrix}
\begin{bmatrix}\mathbf{\hat x} \\ \mathbf{\hat y}  \\ \mathbf{\hat z} \end{bmatrix}$$

=== Time derivative of a vector field ===
To find out how the vector field A changes in time, the time derivatives should be calculated. In Cartesian coordinates this is simply:
$$\mathbf{\dot A} = \dot A_x \mathbf{\hat x} + \dot A_y \mathbf{\hat y} + \dot A_z \mathbf{\hat z}$$
However, in spherical coordinates this becomes:
$$\mathbf{\dot A} = \dot A_r \boldsymbol{\hat r} + A_r \boldsymbol{\dot{\hat r}}
+ \dot A_\theta \boldsymbol{\hat\theta} + A_\theta \boldsymbol{\dot{\hat\theta}}
+ \dot A_\phi \boldsymbol{\hat\phi} + A_\phi \boldsymbol{\dot{\hat\phi}}$$
The time derivatives of the unit vectors are needed. They are given by:
$$\begin{align}
\boldsymbol{\dot{\hat r}} &= \dot\theta \boldsymbol{\hat\theta} + \dot\phi\sin\theta \boldsymbol{\hat\phi} \\
\boldsymbol{\dot{\hat\theta}} &= - \dot\theta \boldsymbol{\hat r} + \dot\phi\cos\theta \boldsymbol{\hat\phi} \\
\boldsymbol{\dot{\hat\phi}} &= - \dot\phi\sin\theta \boldsymbol{\hat{r}} - \dot\phi\cos\theta \boldsymbol{\hat\theta}
\end{align}$$
Thus the time derivative becomes:
$$\mathbf{\dot A}
= \boldsymbol{\hat r} \left(\dot A_r - A_\theta \dot\theta - A_\phi \dot\phi \sin\theta \right)
+ \boldsymbol{\hat\theta} \left(\dot A_\theta + A_r \dot\theta - A_\phi \dot\phi \cos\theta\right)
+ \boldsymbol{\hat\phi} \left(\dot A_\phi + A_r \dot\phi \sin\theta + A_\theta \dot\phi \cos\theta\right)$$

== See also ==
- Del in cylindrical and spherical coordinates for the specification of gradient, divergence, curl, and Laplacian in various coordinate systems.
