= Radial distance =

Radial distance, typically denoted r or ρ (rho), is the distance from the origin to a point along the radial dimension in a:

- Polar coordinate system
- Spherical coordinate system
- Cylindrical coordinate system
