= Del in cylindrical and spherical coordinates =

Mathematical gradient operator in certain coordinate systems

This is a list of some vector calculus formulae for working with common curvilinear coordinate systems.

== Notes ==
- This article uses the standard notation ISO 80000-2, which supersedes ISO 31-11, for spherical coordinates (other sources may reverse the definitions of θ and φ):
  - The polar angle is denoted by $\theta \in [0, \pi]$: it is the angle between the z-axis and the radial vector connecting the origin to the point in question.
  - The azimuthal angle is denoted by $\varphi \in [0, 2\pi]$: it is the angle between the x-axis and the projection of the radial vector onto the xy-plane.
- The function atan2(y, x) can be used instead of the mathematical function arctan(y/x) owing to its domain and image. The classical arctan function has an image of (−π/2, +π/2), whereas atan2 is defined to have an image of (−π, π].

== Coordinate conversions ==
Conversion between Cartesian, cylindrical, and spherical coordinates
		From		
		Cartesian	Cylindrical	Spherical
To	Cartesian	$$\begin{align} x&=x\\ y&=y\\ z&=z\\ \end{align}$$	$$\begin{align} x &= \rho \cos\varphi \\ y &= \rho \sin\varphi \\ z &= z \end{align}$$	$$\begin{align} x &= r \sin\theta \cos\varphi \\ y &= r \sin\theta \sin\varphi \\ z &= r \cos\theta \\ \end{align}$$
To	Cylindrical	$$\begin{align} \rho &= \sqrt{x^2 + y^2} \\ \varphi &= \arctan\left(\frac{y}{x}\right) \\ z &= z \end{align}$$	$$\begin{align} \rho &=\rho\\ \varphi &=\varphi\\ z&=z\\ \end{align}$$	$$\begin{align} \rho &= r \sin\theta \\ \varphi &= \varphi \\ z &= r\cos\theta \end{align}$$
To	Spherical	$$\begin{align} r &= \sqrt{x^2 + y^2 + z^2} \\ \theta &= \arccos\left(\frac{z}{\sqrt{x^2 + y^2 + z^2}}\right) \\ \varphi &= \arctan\left(\frac{y}{x}\right) \end{align}$$	$$\begin{align} r &= \sqrt{\rho^2 + z^2} \\ \theta &= \arctan{\left(\frac{\rho}{z}\right)} \\ \varphi &= \varphi \end{align}$$	$$\begin{align} r&=r\\\theta &=\theta \\\varphi &=\varphi \end{align}$$

Note that the operation $\arctan\left(\frac{A}{B}\right)$ must be interpreted as the two-argument inverse tangent, atan2.

== Unit vector conversions ==
Conversion between unit vectors in Cartesian, cylindrical, and spherical coordinate systems in terms of destination coordinates
	Cartesian	Cylindrical	Spherical
Cartesian	$$\begin{align} \hat{\mathbf x}&=\hat{\mathbf x}\\ \hat{\mathbf y}&=\hat{\mathbf y}\\ \hat{\mathbf z}&=\hat{\mathbf z}\\ \end{align}$$	$$\begin{align} \hat{\mathbf x} &= \cos\varphi \hat{\boldsymbol \rho} - \sin\varphi \hat{\boldsymbol \varphi} \\ \hat{\mathbf y} &= \sin\varphi \hat{\boldsymbol \rho} + \cos\varphi \hat{\boldsymbol \varphi} \\ \hat{\mathbf z} &= \hat{\mathbf z} \end{align}$$	$$\begin{align} \hat{\mathbf x} &= \sin\theta \cos\varphi \hat{\mathbf r} + \cos\theta \cos\varphi \hat{\boldsymbol \theta} - \sin\varphi \hat{\boldsymbol \varphi} \\ \hat{\mathbf y} &= \sin\theta \sin\varphi \hat{\mathbf r} + \cos\theta \sin\varphi \hat{\boldsymbol \theta} + \cos\varphi \hat{\boldsymbol \varphi} \\ \hat{\mathbf z} &= \cos\theta \hat{\mathbf r} - \sin\theta \hat{\boldsymbol \theta} \end{align}$$
Cylindrical	$$\begin{align} \hat{\boldsymbol \rho} &= \frac{x \hat{\mathbf x} + y \hat{\mathbf y}}{\sqrt{x^2 + y^2}} \\ \hat{\boldsymbol \varphi} &= \frac{-y \hat{\mathbf x} + x \hat{\mathbf y}}{\sqrt{x^2 + y^2}} \\ \hat{\mathbf z} &= \hat{\mathbf z} \end{align}$$	$$\begin{align} \hat{\boldsymbol \rho}&=\hat{\boldsymbol \rho}\\ \hat{\boldsymbol \varphi}&=\hat{\boldsymbol \varphi}\\ \hat{\mathbf z}&=\hat{\mathbf z}\\ \end{align}$$	$$\begin{align} \hat{\boldsymbol \rho} &= \sin\theta \hat{\mathbf r} + \cos\theta \hat{\boldsymbol \theta} \\ \hat{\boldsymbol \varphi} &= \hat{\boldsymbol \varphi} \\ \hat{\mathbf z} &= \cos\theta \hat{\mathbf r} - \sin\theta \hat{\boldsymbol \theta} \end{align}$$
Spherical	$$\begin{align} \hat{\mathbf r} &= \frac{x \hat{\mathbf x} + y \hat{\mathbf y} + z \hat{\mathbf z}}{\sqrt{x^2 + y^2 + z^2}} \\ \hat{\boldsymbol \theta} &= \frac{\left(x \hat{\mathbf x} + y \hat{\mathbf y}\right) z - \left(x^2 + y^2\right) \hat{\mathbf z}}{\sqrt{x^2 + y^2 + z^2} \sqrt{x^2 + y^2}} \\ \hat{\boldsymbol \varphi} &= \frac{-y \hat{\mathbf x} + x \hat{\mathbf y}}{\sqrt{x^2 + y^2}} \end{align}$$	$$\begin{align} \hat{\mathbf r} &= \frac{\rho \hat{\boldsymbol \rho} + z \hat{\mathbf z}}{\sqrt{\rho^2 + z^2}} \\ \hat{\boldsymbol \theta} &= \frac{z \hat{\boldsymbol \rho} - \rho \hat{\mathbf z}}{\sqrt{\rho^2 + z^2}} \\ \hat{\boldsymbol \varphi} &= \hat{\boldsymbol \varphi} \end{align}$$	$$\begin{align} \hat{\mathbf r}&=\hat{\mathbf r}\\ \hat{\boldsymbol \theta}&=\hat{\boldsymbol \theta}\\ \hat{\boldsymbol \varphi}&=\hat{\boldsymbol \varphi}\\ \end{align}$$

Conversion between unit vectors in Cartesian, cylindrical, and spherical coordinate systems in terms of source coordinates
	Cartesian	Cylindrical	Spherical
Cartesian	$$\begin{align} \hat{\mathbf x}&=\hat{\mathbf x}\\ \hat{\mathbf y}&=\hat{\mathbf y}\\ \hat{\mathbf z}&=\hat{\mathbf z}\\ \end{align}$$	$$\begin{align} \hat{\mathbf x} &= \frac{x \hat{\boldsymbol \rho} - y \hat{\boldsymbol \varphi}}{\sqrt{x^2 + y^2}} \\ \hat{\mathbf y} &= \frac{y \hat{\boldsymbol \rho} + x \hat{\boldsymbol \varphi}}{\sqrt{x^2 + y^2}} \\ \hat{\mathbf z} &= \hat{\mathbf z} \end{align}$$	$$\begin{align} \hat{\mathbf x} &= \frac{x \left(\sqrt{x^2 + y^2} \hat{\mathbf r} + z \hat{\boldsymbol \theta}\right) - y \sqrt{x^2 + y^2 + z^2} \hat{\boldsymbol \varphi}}{\sqrt{x^2 + y^2} \sqrt{x^2 + y^2 + z^2}} \\ \hat{\mathbf y} &= \frac{y \left(\sqrt{x^2 + y^2} \hat{\mathbf r} + z \hat{\boldsymbol \theta}\right) + x \sqrt{x^2 + y^2 + z^2} \hat{\boldsymbol \varphi}}{\sqrt{x^2 + y^2} \sqrt{x^2 + y^2 + z^2}} \\ \hat{\mathbf z} &= \frac{z \hat{\mathbf r} - \sqrt{x^2 + y^2} \hat{\boldsymbol \theta}}{\sqrt{x^2 + y^2 + z^2}} \end{align}$$
Cylindrical	$$\begin{align} \hat{\boldsymbol \rho} &= \cos\varphi \hat{\mathbf x} + \sin\varphi \hat{\mathbf y} \\ \hat{\boldsymbol \varphi} &= -\sin\varphi \hat{\mathbf x} + \cos\varphi \hat{\mathbf y} \\ \hat{\mathbf z} &= \hat{\mathbf z} \end{align}$$	$$\begin{align} \hat{\boldsymbol \rho}&=\hat{\boldsymbol \rho}\\ \hat{\boldsymbol \varphi}&=\hat{\boldsymbol \varphi}\\ \hat{\mathbf z}&=\hat{\mathbf z}\\ \end{align}$$	$$\begin{align} \hat{\boldsymbol \rho} &= \frac{\rho \hat{\mathbf r} + z \hat{\boldsymbol \theta}}{\sqrt{\rho^2 + z^2}} \\ \hat{\boldsymbol \varphi} &= \hat{\boldsymbol \varphi} \\ \hat{\mathbf z} &= \frac{z \hat{\mathbf r} - \rho \hat{\boldsymbol \theta}}{\sqrt{\rho^2 + z^2}} \end{align}$$
Spherical	$$\begin{align} \hat{\mathbf r} &= \sin\theta \left(\cos\varphi \hat{\mathbf x} + \sin\varphi \hat{\mathbf y}\right) + \cos\theta \hat{\mathbf z} \\ \hat{\boldsymbol \theta} &= \cos\theta \left(\cos\varphi \hat{\mathbf x} + \sin\varphi \hat{\mathbf y}\right) - \sin\theta \hat{\mathbf z} \\ \hat{\boldsymbol \varphi} &= -\sin\varphi \hat{\mathbf x} + \cos\varphi \hat{\mathbf y} \end{align}$$	$$\begin{align} \hat{\mathbf r} &= \sin\theta \hat{\boldsymbol \rho} + \cos\theta \hat{\mathbf z} \\ \hat{\boldsymbol \theta} &= \cos\theta \hat{\boldsymbol \rho} - \sin\theta \hat{\mathbf z} \\ \hat{\boldsymbol \varphi} &= \hat{\boldsymbol \varphi} \end{align}$$	$$\begin{align} \hat{\mathbf r}&=\hat{\mathbf r}\\ \hat{\boldsymbol \theta}&=\hat{\boldsymbol \theta}\\ \hat{\boldsymbol \varphi}&=\hat{\boldsymbol \varphi}\\ \end{align}$$

== Del formula ==
Table with the del operator in cartesian, cylindrical and spherical coordinates
Operation	Cartesian coordinates (x, y, z)	Cylindrical coordinates (ρ, φ, z)	Spherical coordinates (r, θ, φ), where θ is the polar angle and φ is the azimuthal angle^{α}
Vector field A	$A_x \hat{\mathbf x} + A_y \hat{\mathbf y} + A_z \hat{\mathbf z}$	$A_\rho \hat{\boldsymbol \rho} + A_\varphi \hat{\boldsymbol \varphi} + A_z \hat{\mathbf z}$	$A_r \hat{\mathbf r} + A_\theta \hat{\boldsymbol \theta} + A_\varphi \hat{\boldsymbol \varphi}$
Gradient ∇f	${\partial f \over \partial x}\hat{\mathbf x} + {\partial f \over \partial y}\hat{\mathbf y} + {\partial f \over \partial z}\hat{\mathbf z}$	${\partial f \over \partial \rho}\hat{\boldsymbol \rho} + {1 \over \rho}{\partial f \over \partial \varphi}\hat{\boldsymbol \varphi} + {\partial f \over \partial z}\hat{\mathbf z}$	${\partial f \over \partial r}\hat{\mathbf r} + {1 \over r}{\partial f \over \partial \theta}\hat{\boldsymbol \theta} + {1 \over r\sin\theta}{\partial f \over \partial \varphi}\hat{\boldsymbol \varphi}$
Divergence ∇ ⋅ A	${\partial A_x \over \partial x} + {\partial A_y \over \partial y} + {\partial A_z \over \partial z}$	${1 \over \rho}{\partial \left( \rho A_\rho \right) \over \partial \rho} + {1 \over \rho}{\partial A_\varphi \over \partial \varphi} + {\partial A_z \over \partial z}$	${1 \over r^2}{\partial \left( r^2 A_r \right) \over \partial r} + {1 \over r\sin\theta}{\partial \over \partial \theta} \left( A_\theta\sin\theta \right) + {1 \over r\sin\theta}{\partial A_\varphi \over \partial \varphi}$
Curl ∇ × A	$$\begin{align} \left(\frac{\partial A_z}{\partial y} - \frac{\partial A_y}{\partial z}\right) &\hat{\mathbf x} \\ + \left(\frac{\partial A_x}{\partial z} - \frac{\partial A_z}{\partial x}\right) &\hat{\mathbf y} \\ + \left(\frac{\partial A_y}{\partial x} - \frac{\partial A_x}{\partial y}\right) &\hat{\mathbf z} \end{align}$$	$$\begin{align} \left( \frac{1}{\rho}\frac{\partial A_z}{\partial \varphi} - \frac{\partial A_\varphi}{\partial z} \right) &\hat{\boldsymbol \rho} \\ + \left( \frac{\partial A_\rho}{\partial z} - \frac{\partial A_z}{\partial \rho} \right) &\hat{\boldsymbol \varphi} \\ + \frac{1}{\rho} \left( \frac{\partial \left(\rho A_\varphi\right)}{\partial \rho} - \frac{\partial A_\rho}{\partial \varphi} \right) &\hat{\mathbf z} \end{align}$$	$$\begin{align} \frac{1}{r\sin\theta} \left( \frac{\partial}{\partial \theta} \left(A_\varphi\sin\theta \right) - \frac{\partial A_\theta}{\partial \varphi} \right) &\hat{\mathbf r} \\ {}+ \frac{1}{r} \left( \frac{1}{\sin\theta} \frac{\partial A_r}{\partial \varphi} - \frac{\partial}{\partial r} \left( r A_\varphi \right) \right) &\hat{\boldsymbol \theta}  \\ {}+ \frac{1}{r} \left( \frac{\partial}{\partial r} \left( r A_{\theta} \right) - \frac{\partial A_r}{\partial \theta} \right) &\hat{\boldsymbol \varphi} \end{align}$$
Laplace operator ∇^{2}f ≡ ∆f	${\partial^2 f \over \partial x^2} + {\partial^2 f \over \partial y^2} + {\partial^2 f \over \partial z^2}$	${1 \over \rho}{\partial \over \partial \rho}\left(\rho {\partial f \over \partial \rho}\right) + {1 \over \rho^2}{\partial^2 f \over \partial \varphi^2} + {\partial^2 f \over \partial z^2}$	${1 \over r^2}{\partial \over \partial r}\!\left(r^2 {\partial f \over \partial r}\right) \!+\!{1 \over r^2\!\sin\theta}{\partial \over \partial \theta}\!\left(\sin\theta {\partial f \over \partial \theta}\right) \!+\!{1 \over r^2\!\sin^2\theta}{\partial^2 f \over \partial \varphi^2}$
Vector gradient ∇A^{β}	$$\begin{align}{}&\frac{\partial A_x}{\partial x} \hat{\mathbf x} \otimes \hat{\mathbf x} + \frac{\partial A_x}{\partial y} \hat{\mathbf x} \otimes \hat{\mathbf y} + \frac{\partial A_x}{\partial z} \hat{\mathbf x} \otimes \hat{\mathbf z} \\ {}+ &\frac{\partial A_y}{\partial x} \hat{\mathbf y} \otimes \hat{\mathbf x} + \frac{\partial A_y}{\partial y} \hat{\mathbf y} \otimes \hat{\mathbf y} + \frac{\partial A_y}{\partial z} \hat{\mathbf y} \otimes \hat{\mathbf z} \\ {}+ &\frac{\partial A_z}{\partial x} \hat{\mathbf z} \otimes \hat{\mathbf x} + \frac{\partial A_z}{\partial y} \hat{\mathbf z} \otimes \hat{\mathbf y} + \frac{\partial A_z}{\partial z} \hat{\mathbf z} \otimes \hat{\mathbf z}\end{align}$$	$$\begin{align}{}&\frac{\partial A_\rho}{\partial \rho} \hat{\boldsymbol \rho} \otimes \hat{\boldsymbol \rho} + \left(\frac{1}{\rho}\frac{\partial A_\rho}{\partial \varphi}-\frac{A_\varphi}{\rho}\right) \hat{\boldsymbol \rho} \otimes \hat{\boldsymbol \varphi} + \frac{\partial A_\rho}{\partial z} \hat{\boldsymbol \rho} \otimes \hat{\mathbf z} \\ {}+ &\frac{\partial A_\varphi}{\partial \rho} \hat{\boldsymbol \varphi} \otimes \hat{\boldsymbol \rho} + \left(\frac{1}{\rho}\frac{\partial A_\varphi}{\partial \varphi}+\frac{A_\rho}{\rho}\right) \hat{\boldsymbol \varphi} \otimes \hat{\boldsymbol \varphi} + \frac{\partial A_\varphi}{\partial z} \hat{\boldsymbol \varphi} \otimes \hat{\mathbf z} \\ {}+ &\frac{\partial A_z}{\partial \rho} \hat{\mathbf z} \otimes \hat{\boldsymbol \rho} + \frac{1}{\rho}\frac{\partial A_z}{\partial \varphi} \hat{\mathbf z} \otimes \hat{\boldsymbol \varphi} + \frac{\partial A_z}{\partial z} \hat{\mathbf z} \otimes \hat{\mathbf z}\end{align}$$	$$\begin{align}{}&\frac{\partial A_r}{\partial r} \hat{\mathbf r} \otimes \hat{\mathbf r} + \left(\frac{1}{r}\frac{\partial A_r}{\partial \theta}-\frac{A_\theta}{r}\right) \hat{\mathbf r} \otimes \hat{\boldsymbol \theta} + \left(\frac{1}{r \sin\theta}\frac{\partial A_r}{\partial \varphi} - \frac{A_\varphi}{r}\right) \hat{\mathbf r} \otimes \hat{\boldsymbol \varphi} \\ {}+ &\frac{\partial A_\theta}{\partial r} \hat{\boldsymbol \theta} \otimes \hat{\mathbf r} + \left(\frac{1}{r}\frac{\partial A_\theta}{\partial \theta}+\frac{A_r}{r}\right) \hat{\boldsymbol \theta} \otimes \hat{\boldsymbol \theta} + \left(\frac{1}{r \sin\theta}\frac{\partial A_\theta}{\partial \varphi} - \cot\theta \frac{A_\varphi}{r}\right) \hat{\boldsymbol \theta} \otimes \hat{\boldsymbol \varphi} \\ {}+ &\frac{\partial A_\varphi}{\partial r} \hat{\boldsymbol \varphi} \otimes \hat{\mathbf r} + \frac{1}{r}\frac{\partial A_\varphi}{\partial \theta} \hat{\boldsymbol \varphi} \otimes \hat{\boldsymbol \theta} + \left(\frac{1}{r \sin\theta}\frac{\partial A_\varphi}{\partial \varphi} + \cot\theta \frac{A_\theta}{r} + \frac{A_r}{r}\right) \hat{\boldsymbol \varphi} \otimes \hat{\boldsymbol \varphi}\end{align}$$
Vector Laplacian ∇^{2}A ≡ ∆A	$\nabla^2 A_x \hat{\mathbf x} + \nabla^2 A_y \hat{\mathbf y} + \nabla^2 A_z \hat{\mathbf z}$	$$\begin{align} \mathopen{}\left(\nabla^2 A_\rho - \frac{A_\rho}{\rho^2} - \frac{2}{\rho^2} \frac{\partial A_\varphi}{\partial \varphi}\right)\mathclose{} &\hat{\boldsymbol \rho} \\ + \mathopen{}\left(\nabla^2 A_\varphi - \frac{A_\varphi}{\rho^2} + \frac{2}{\rho^2} \frac{\partial A_\rho}{\partial \varphi}\right)\mathclose{} &\hat{\boldsymbol \varphi} \\ {}+ \nabla^2 A_z &\hat{\mathbf z} \end{align}$$	$$\begin{align} \left(\nabla^2 A_r - \frac{2 A_r}{r^2} - \frac{2}{r^2\sin\theta} \frac{\partial \left(A_\theta \sin\theta\right)}{\partial\theta} - \frac{2}{r^2\sin\theta}{\frac{\partial A_\varphi}{\partial \varphi}}\right) &\hat{\mathbf r} \\ + \left(\nabla^2 A_\theta - \frac{A_\theta}{r^2\sin^2\theta} + \frac{2}{r^2} \frac{\partial A_r}{\partial \theta} - \frac{2 \cos\theta}{r^2\sin^2\theta} \frac{\partial A_\varphi}{\partial \varphi}\right) &\hat{\boldsymbol \theta} \\ + \left(\nabla^2 A_\varphi - \frac{A_\varphi}{r^2\sin^2\theta} + \frac{2}{r^2\sin\theta} \frac{\partial A_r}{\partial \varphi} + \frac{2 \cos\theta}{r^2\sin^2\theta} \frac{\partial A_\theta}{\partial \varphi}\right) &\hat{\boldsymbol \varphi} \end{align}$$
Directional derivative (A ⋅ ∇)B	$\mathbf{A} \cdot \nabla B_x \hat{\mathbf x} + \mathbf{A} \cdot \nabla B_y \hat{\mathbf y} + \mathbf{A} \cdot \nabla B_z \hat{\mathbf{z}}$	$$\begin{align} \left(A_\rho \frac{\partial B_\rho}{\partial \rho}+\frac{A_\varphi}{\rho}\frac{\partial B_\rho}{\partial \varphi}+A_z\frac{\partial B_\rho}{\partial z}-\frac{A_\varphi B_\varphi}{\rho}\right) &\hat{\boldsymbol \rho} \\ + \left(A_\rho \frac{\partial B_\varphi}{\partial \rho} + \frac{A_\varphi}{\rho}\frac{\partial B_\varphi}{\partial \varphi} + A_z\frac{\partial B_\varphi}{\partial z} + \frac{A_\varphi B_\rho}{\rho}\right) &\hat{\boldsymbol \varphi}\\ + \left(A_\rho \frac{\partial B_z}{\partial \rho}+\frac{A_\varphi}{\rho}\frac{\partial B_z}{\partial \varphi}+A_z\frac{\partial B_z}{\partial z}\right) &\hat{\mathbf z} \end{align}$$	$$\begin{align} \left( A_r \frac{\partial B_r}{\partial r} + \frac{A_\theta}{r} \frac{\partial B_r}{\partial \theta} + \frac{A_\varphi}{r\sin\theta} \frac{\partial B_r}{\partial \varphi} - \frac{A_\theta B_\theta + A_\varphi B_\varphi}{r} \right) &\hat{\mathbf r} \\ + \left( A_r \frac{\partial B_\theta}{\partial r} + \frac{A_\theta}{r} \frac{\partial B_\theta}{\partial \theta} + \frac{A_\varphi}{r\sin\theta} \frac{\partial B_\theta}{\partial \varphi} + \frac{A_\theta B_r}{r} - \frac{A_\varphi B_\varphi\cot\theta}{r} \right) &\hat{\boldsymbol \theta} \\ + \left( A_r \frac{\partial B_\varphi}{\partial r} + \frac{A_\theta}{r} \frac{\partial B_\varphi}{\partial \theta} + \frac{A_\varphi}{r\sin\theta} \frac{\partial B_\varphi}{\partial \varphi} + \frac{A_\varphi B_r}{r} + \frac{A_\varphi B_\theta \cot\theta}{r} \right) &\hat{\boldsymbol \varphi} \end{align}$$
Tensor divergence ∇ ⋅ T^{γ}	$$\begin{align} \left(\frac{\partial T_{xx}}{\partial x}+\frac{\partial T_{yx}}{\partial y}+\frac{\partial T_{zx}}{\partial z}\right)&\hat{\mathbf x} \\ +\left(\frac{\partial T_{xy}}{\partial x}+\frac{\partial T_{yy}}{\partial y}+\frac{\partial T_{zy}}{\partial z}\right)&\hat{\mathbf y} \\ +\left(\frac{\partial T_{xz}}{\partial x}+\frac{\partial T_{yz}}{\partial y}+\frac{\partial T_{zz}}{\partial z}\right)&\hat{\mathbf z} \end{align}$$	$$\begin{align} \left[\frac{\partial T_{\rho\rho}}{\partial\rho}+\frac1\rho\frac{\partial T_{\varphi\rho}}{\partial\varphi}+\frac{\partial T_{z\rho}}{\partial z}+\frac1\rho(T_{\rho\rho}-T_{\varphi\varphi})\right]&\hat{\boldsymbol\rho} \\ +\left[\frac{\partial T_{\rho\varphi}}{\partial\rho}+\frac1\rho\frac{\partial T_{\varphi\varphi}}{\partial\varphi}+\frac{\partial T_{z\varphi}}{\partial z}+\frac1\rho(T_{\rho\varphi}+T_{\varphi\rho})\right]&\hat{\boldsymbol\varphi} \\ +\left[\frac{\partial T_{\rho z}}{\partial\rho}+\frac1\rho\frac{\partial T_{\varphi z}}{\partial\varphi}+\frac{\partial T_{zz}}{\partial z}+\frac{T_{\rho z}}\rho\right]&\hat{\mathbf z} \end{align}$$	$$\begin{align} \left[\frac{\partial T_{rr}}{\partial r}+2\frac{T_{rr}}r+\frac1r\frac{\partial T_{\theta r}}{\partial\theta}+\frac{\cot\theta}rT_{\theta r}+\frac1{r\sin\theta}\frac{\partial T_{\varphi r}}{\partial\varphi}-\frac1r(T_{\theta\theta}+T_{\varphi\varphi})\right]&\hat{\mathbf r} \\ +\left[\frac{\partial T_{r\theta}}{\partial r}+2\frac{T_{r\theta}}r+\frac1r\frac{\partial T_{\theta\theta}}{\partial\theta}+\frac{\cot\theta}rT_{\theta\theta}+\frac1{r\sin\theta}\frac{\partial T_{\varphi\theta}}{\partial\varphi}+\frac{T_{\theta r}}r-\frac{\cot\theta}rT_{\varphi\varphi}\right]&\hat{\boldsymbol\theta} \\ +\left[\frac{\partial T_{r\varphi}}{\partial r}+2\frac{T_{r\varphi}}r+\frac1r\frac{\partial T_{\theta\varphi}}{\partial\theta}+\frac1{r\sin\theta}\frac{\partial T_{\varphi\varphi}}{\partial\varphi}+\frac {T_{\varphi r}}{r}+\frac{\cot\theta}{r} (T_{\theta\varphi}+T_{\varphi\theta})\right]&\hat{\boldsymbol\varphi} \end{align}$$

- ^α This page uses $\theta$ for the polar angle and $\varphi$ for the azimuthal angle, which is common notation in physics. The source that is used for these formulae uses $\theta$ for the azimuthal angle and $\varphi$ for the polar angle, which is common mathematical notation. In order to get the mathematics formulae, switch $\theta$ and $\varphi$ in the formulae shown in the table above.
- ^β Defined in Cartesian coordinates as $\partial_i \mathbf{A} \otimes \mathbf{e}_i$. An alternative definition is $\mathbf{e}_i \otimes \partial_i \mathbf{A}$.
- ^γ Defined in Cartesian coordinates as $\mathbf{e}_i \cdot \partial_i \mathbf{T}$. An alternative definition is $\partial_i \mathbf{T} \cdot \mathbf{e}_i$.

=== Differential elements ===
Operation	Cartesian coordinates (x, y, z)	Cylindrical coordinates (ρ, φ, z)	Spherical coordinates^{α} (r, θ, φ)
Differential displacement dℓ	$dx \, \hat{\mathbf x} + dy \, \hat{\mathbf y} + dz \, \hat{\mathbf z}$	$d\rho \, \hat{\boldsymbol \rho} + \rho \, d\varphi \, \hat{\boldsymbol \varphi} + dz \, \hat{\mathbf z}$	$dr \, \hat{\mathbf r} + r \, d\theta \, \hat{\boldsymbol \theta} + r \, \sin\theta \, d\varphi \, \hat{\boldsymbol \varphi}$
Differential normal area dS	$$\begin{align} dy \, dz &\, \hat{\mathbf x} \\ {} + dx \, dz &\, \hat{\mathbf y} \\ {} + dx \, dy &\, \hat{\mathbf z} \end{align}$$	$$\begin{align} \rho \, d\varphi \, dz &\, \hat{\boldsymbol \rho} \\ {} + d\rho \, dz &\, \hat{\boldsymbol \varphi} \\ {} + \rho \, d\rho \, d\varphi &\, \hat{\mathbf z} \end{align}$$	$$\begin{align} r^2 \sin\theta \, d\theta \, d\varphi &\, \hat{\mathbf r} \\ {} + r \sin\theta \, dr \, d\varphi &\, \hat{\boldsymbol \theta} \\ {} + r \, dr \, d\theta &\, \hat{\boldsymbol \varphi} \end{align}$$
Differential volume dV	$dx \, dy \, dz$	$\rho \, d\rho \, d\varphi \, dz$	$r^2 \sin\theta \, dr \, d\theta \, d\varphi$

=== Calculation rules ===
1. $\operatorname{div} \, \operatorname{grad} f \equiv \nabla \cdot \nabla f \equiv \nabla^2 f$
2. $\operatorname{curl} \, \operatorname{grad} f \equiv \nabla \times \nabla f = \mathbf 0$
3. $\operatorname{div} \, \operatorname{curl} \mathbf{A} \equiv \nabla \cdot (\nabla \times \mathbf{A}) = 0$
4. $\operatorname{curl} \, \operatorname{curl} \mathbf{A} \equiv \nabla \times (\nabla \times \mathbf{A}) = \nabla (\nabla \cdot \mathbf{A}) - \nabla^2 \mathbf{A}$ (Lagrange's formula for del)
5. $\nabla^2 (f g) = f \nabla^2 g + 2 \nabla f \cdot \nabla g + g \nabla^2 f$
6. $\nabla^{2}\left(\mathbf{P}\cdot\mathbf{Q}\right)=\mathbf{Q}\cdot\nabla^{2}\mathbf{P}-\mathbf{P}\cdot\nabla^{2}\mathbf{Q}+2\nabla\cdot\left[\left(\mathbf{P}\cdot\nabla\right)\mathbf{Q}+\mathbf{P}\times\nabla\times\mathbf{Q}\right]\quad$ (From )

== Cartesian derivation ==

$$\begin{align}
\operatorname{div} \mathbf A &= \lim_{V\to 0} \frac{\iint_{\partial V} \mathbf A \cdot d\mathbf{S}}{\iiint_V dV} \\[1ex]
&= \frac{\left[A_x(x{+}dx) - A_x(x)\right] dy\,dz + \left[A_y(y{+}dy) - A_y(y)\right] dx\,dz + \left[A_z(z{+}dz) - A_z(z)\right]dx\,dy}{dx\,dy\,dz} \\
&= \frac{\partial A_x}{\partial x} + \frac{\partial A_y}{\partial y} + \frac{\partial A_z}{\partial z}
\end{align}$$

$$\begin{align}
(\operatorname{curl} \mathbf A)_x &= \lim_{S^{\perp \mathbf{\hat x}}\to 0} \frac{\int_{\partial S} \mathbf A \cdot d\mathbf{\ell}}{\iint_{S} dS} \\[1ex]
&= \frac{\left[A_z(y{+}dy) - A_z(y)\right] dz - \left[A_y(z{+}dz) - A_y(z)\right] dy }{dy\,dz} \\
&= \frac{\partial A_z}{\partial y} - \frac{\partial A_y}{\partial z}
\end{align}$$

The expressions for $(\operatorname{curl} \mathbf A)_y$ and $(\operatorname{curl} \mathbf A)_z$ are found in the same way.

== Cylindrical derivation ==

$$\begin{align}
\operatorname{div} \mathbf A &= \lim_{V\to 0} \frac{\iint_{\partial V} \mathbf A \cdot d\mathbf{S}}{\iiint_V dV} \\
&= \frac{\left[A_\rho(\rho{+}d\rho)(\rho{+}d\rho) - A_\rho(\rho)\rho \right] d\phi \,dz + \left[A_\phi(\phi{+}d\phi) - A_\phi(\phi)\right] d\rho\, dz + \left[A_z(z{+}dz) - A_z(z)\right]d\rho (\rho{+}d\rho/2)\, d\phi}{\rho \,d\phi \,d\rho\, dz} \\
&= \frac 1 \rho \frac{\partial (\rho A_\rho)}{\partial \rho} + \frac 1 \rho \frac{\partial A_\phi}{\partial \phi} + \frac{\partial A_z}{\partial z}
\end{align}$$

$$\begin{align}
(\operatorname{curl} \mathbf A)_\rho
&= \lim_{S^{\perp \hat{\boldsymbol \rho}}\to 0} \frac{\int_{\partial S} \mathbf A \cdot d\boldsymbol{\ell}}{\iint_{S} dS} \\[1ex]
&= \frac{A_\phi (z) \left(\rho+d\rho\right)\,d\phi - A_\phi(z+dz) \left(\rho+d\rho\right)\,d\phi + A_z(\phi + d\phi)\,dz - A_z(\phi)\,dz}{\left(\rho+d\rho\right)\,d\phi \,dz} \\[1ex]
&= -\frac{\partial A_\phi}{\partial z} + \frac{1}{\rho} \frac{\partial A_z}{\partial \phi}
\end{align}$$

$$\begin{align}
(\operatorname{curl} \mathbf A)_\phi &= \lim_{S^{\perp \boldsymbol{\hat \phi}}\to 0} \frac{\int_{\partial S} \mathbf A \cdot d\boldsymbol{\ell}}{\iint_{S} dS} \\
&= \frac{A_z (\rho)\,dz - A_z(\rho + d\rho)\,dz + A_\rho(z+dz)\,d\rho - A_\rho(z)\,d\rho}{d\rho \,dz} \\
&= -\frac{\partial A_z}{\partial \rho} + \frac{\partial A_\rho}{\partial z}
\end{align}$$

$$\begin{align}
(\operatorname{curl} \mathbf A)_z &= \lim_{S^{\perp \hat{\boldsymbol z}}\to 0} \frac{\int_{\partial S} \mathbf A \cdot d\mathbf{\ell}}{\iint_{S} dS} \\[1ex]
&= \frac{A_\rho(\phi)\,d\rho - A_\rho(\phi + d\phi)\,d\rho + A_\phi(\rho + d\rho)(\rho + d\rho)\,d\phi - A_\phi(\rho)\rho \,d\phi}{\rho \,d\rho \,d\phi} \\[1ex]
&= -\frac{1}{\rho}\frac{\partial A_\rho}{\partial \phi} + \frac{1}{\rho} \frac{\partial (\rho A_\phi)}{\partial \rho}
\end{align}$$

$$\begin{align}
\operatorname{curl} \mathbf A &= (\operatorname{curl} \mathbf A)_\rho \hat{\boldsymbol \rho} + (\operatorname{curl} \mathbf A)_\phi \hat{\boldsymbol \phi} + (\operatorname{curl} \mathbf A)_z \hat{\boldsymbol z} \\[1ex]
&= \left(\frac{1}{\rho} \frac{\partial A_z}{\partial \phi} -\frac{\partial A_\phi}{\partial z} \right) \hat{\boldsymbol \rho} + \left(\frac{\partial A_\rho}{\partial z}-\frac{\partial A_z}{\partial \rho} \right) \hat{\boldsymbol \phi} + \frac{1}{\rho}\left(\frac{\partial (\rho A_\phi)}{\partial \rho} - \frac{\partial A_\rho}{\partial \phi} \right) \hat{\boldsymbol z}
\end{align}$$

== Spherical derivation ==
$$\begin{align}
\operatorname{div} \mathbf A &= \lim_{V\to 0} \frac{\iint_{\partial V} \mathbf A \cdot d\mathbf{S}}{\iiint_V dV} \\
&= \frac{\left[A_r(r{+}dr) (r{+}dr)^2 - A_r(r)r^2\right] \sin\theta \, d\theta\, d\phi + \left[A_\theta(\theta{+}d\theta)\sin(\theta{+}d\theta) - A_\theta(\theta) \sin\theta\right]r \,dr \,d\phi + \left[A_\phi(\phi{+}d\phi) - A_\phi(\phi)\right]r\,dr \,d\theta}{dr\,r\,d\theta\,r\sin\theta\, d\phi} \\
&= \frac{1}{r^2}\frac{\partial (r^2A_r)}{\partial r} + \frac{1}{r \sin\theta} \frac{\partial(A_\theta\sin\theta)}{\partial \theta} + \frac{1}{r \sin\theta} \frac{\partial A_\phi}{\partial \phi}
\end{align}$$

$$\begin{align}
(\operatorname{curl} \mathbf A)_r &= \lim_{S^{\perp \boldsymbol{\hat r}}\to 0} \frac{\int_{\partial S} \mathbf A \cdot d\mathbf{\ell}}{\iint_{S} dS} \\[1ex]
&= \frac{A_\theta(\phi)r \,d\theta + A_\phi(\theta + d\theta)r \sin(\theta + d\theta)\, d\phi
- A_\theta(\phi + d\phi)r \,d\theta - A_\phi(\theta)r\sin(\theta)\, d\phi}{r\, d\theta\,r\sin\theta \,d\phi} \\
&= \frac{1}{r\sin\theta}\frac{\partial(A_\phi \sin\theta)}{\partial \theta}
- \frac{1}{r\sin\theta} \frac{\partial A_\theta}{\partial \phi}
\end{align}$$

$$\begin{align}
(\operatorname{curl} \mathbf A)_\theta &= \lim_{S^{\perp \boldsymbol{\hat \theta}}\to 0} \frac{\int_{\partial S} \mathbf A \cdot d\mathbf{\ell}}{\iint_{S} dS} \\[1ex]
&= \frac{A_\phi(r)r \sin\theta \,d\phi + A_r(\phi + d\phi)\,dr
- A_\phi(r+dr)(r+dr)\sin\theta \,d\phi - A_r(\phi)\,dr}{dr \, r \sin \theta \,d\phi} \\
&= \frac{1}{r\sin\theta}\frac{\partial A_r}{\partial \phi}
- \frac{1}{r} \frac{\partial (rA_\phi)}{\partial r}
\end{align}$$

$$\begin{align}
(\operatorname{curl} \mathbf A)_\phi &= \lim_{S^{\perp \boldsymbol{\hat \phi}}\to 0} \frac{\int_{\partial S} \mathbf A \cdot d\mathbf{\ell}}{\iint_{S} dS} \\[1ex]
&= \frac{A_r(\theta)\,dr + A_\theta(r+dr)(r+dr)\,d\theta
- A_r(\theta+d\theta)\,dr - A_\theta(r) r \,d\theta}{r\,dr\, d\theta} \\
&= \frac{1}{r}\frac{\partial(rA_\theta)}{\partial r}
- \frac{1}{r} \frac{\partial A_r}{\partial \theta}
\end{align}$$

$$\begin{align}
\operatorname{curl} \mathbf A
&= (\operatorname{curl} \mathbf A)_r \, \hat{\boldsymbol r} + (\operatorname{curl} \mathbf A)_\theta \, \hat{\boldsymbol \theta} + (\operatorname{curl} \mathbf A)_\phi \, \hat{\boldsymbol \phi} \\[1ex]
&= \frac{1}{r\sin\theta} \left(\frac{\partial(A_\phi \sin\theta)}{\partial \theta}-\frac{\partial A_\theta}{\partial \phi} \right) \hat{\boldsymbol r} +\frac{1}{r} \left(\frac{1}{\sin\theta}\frac{\partial A_r}{\partial \phi} - \frac{\partial (rA_\phi)}{\partial r} \right) \hat{\boldsymbol \theta} + \frac{1}{r}\left(\frac{\partial(rA_\theta)}{\partial r} - \frac{\partial A_r}{\partial \theta} \right) \hat{\boldsymbol \phi}
\end{align}$$

== Unit vector conversion formula ==
The unit vector of a coordinate parameter u is defined in such a way that a small positive change in u causes the position vector $\mathbf r$ to change in $\mathbf u$ direction.

Therefore,
$$\frac{\partial {\mathbf r}}{\partial u} = \frac{\partial{s}}{\partial u} \mathbf u$$
where s is the arc length parameter.

For two sets of coordinate systems $u_i$ and $v_j$, according to chain rule,
$$\begin{align}
d\mathbf r &= \sum_{i} \frac{\partial \mathbf r}{\partial u_i} \, du_i
= \sum_{i} \frac{\partial s}{\partial u_i} \hat{\mathbf u}_i du_i
= \sum_{j} \frac{\partial s}{\partial v_j} \hat{\mathbf v}_j \, dv_j \\
&= \sum_{j} \frac{\partial s}{\partial v_j} \hat{\mathbf v}_j \sum_{i} \frac{\partial v_j}{\partial u_i} \, du_i \\
&= \sum_{i} \sum_{j} \frac{\partial s}{\partial v_j} \frac{\partial v_j}{\partial u_i} \hat{\mathbf v}_j \, du_i.
\end{align}$$

Now, we isolate the $i$^{th} component. For $i{\neq}k$, let $\mathrm d u_k=0$. Then divide on both sides by $\mathrm d u_i$ to get:
$$\frac{\partial s}{\partial u_i} \hat{\mathbf u}_i = \sum_{j} \frac{\partial s}{\partial v_j} \frac{\partial v_j}{\partial u_i} \hat{\mathbf v}_j.$$

== See also ==
- Del
- Orthogonal coordinates
- Curvilinear coordinates
- Vector fields in cylindrical and spherical coordinates
