= Vector operator =

Differential operator used in vector calculus

A vector operator is a differential operator used in vector calculus. Vector operators include:

- Gradient is a vector operator that operates on a scalar field, producing a vector field.
- Divergence is a vector operator that operates on a vector field, producing a scalar field.
- Curl is a vector operator that operates on a vector field, producing a vector field.

Defined in terms of del:

$$\begin{align}
\operatorname{grad} &\equiv \nabla \\
\operatorname{div} &\equiv \nabla \cdot \\
\operatorname{curl} &\equiv \nabla \times
\end{align}$$

The Laplacian operates on a scalar field, producing a scalar field:

$$\nabla^2 \equiv \operatorname{div}\ \operatorname{grad} \equiv \nabla \cdot \nabla$$

Vector operators must always come right before the scalar field or vector field on which they operate, in order to produce a result. E.g.

$$\nabla f$$

yields the gradient of f, but

$$f \nabla$$

is just another vector operator, which is not operating on anything.

A vector operator can operate on another vector operator, to produce a compound vector operator, as seen above in the case of the Laplacian.

== See also ==
- del
- d'Alembert operator
