= Del =

Vector differential operator

Del operator, represented by the nabla symbol

Del, or nabla, is an operator used in mathematics (particularly in vector calculus) as a vector differential operator, usually represented by ∇ (the nabla symbol). When applied to a function defined on a one-dimensional domain, it denotes the standard derivative of the function as defined in calculus. When applied to a field (a function defined on a multi-dimensional domain), it may denote any one of three operations depending on the way it is applied: the gradient or (locally) steepest slope of a scalar field (or sometimes of a vector field, as in the Navier–Stokes equations); the divergence of a vector field; or the curl (rotation) of a vector field.

Del is a very convenient mathematical notation for those three operations (gradient, divergence, and curl) that makes many equations easier to write and remember. The del symbol (or nabla) can be formally defined as a vector operator whose components are the corresponding partial derivative operators. As a vector operator, it can act on scalar and vector fields in three different ways, giving rise to three different differential operations: first, it can act on scalar fields by a formal scalar multiplication—to give a vector field called the gradient; second, it can act on vector fields by a formal dot product—to give a scalar field called the divergence; and lastly, it can act on vector fields by a formal cross product—to give a vector field called the curl. These formal products do not necessarily commute with other operators or products. These three uses are summarized as:

- Gradient: $\operatorname{grad}f = \nabla f$
- Divergence: $\operatorname{div}\mathbf v = \nabla \cdot \mathbf v$
- Curl: $\operatorname{curl}\mathbf v = \nabla \times \mathbf v$

== Definition ==
In the Cartesian coordinate system $\mathbb{R}^n$ with coordinates $(x_1, \dots, x_n)$ and standard basis $\{\mathbf e_1, \dots, \mathbf e_n \}$, del is a vector operator whose $x_1, \dots, x_n$ components are the partial derivative operators ${\partial \over \partial x_1}, \dots, {\partial \over \partial x_n}$; that is,

$$\nabla = \sum_{i=1}^n \mathbf e_i {\partial \over \partial x_i} = \left({\partial \over \partial x_1}, \ldots, {\partial \over \partial x_n} \right)$$

where the expression in parentheses is a row vector. In three-dimensional Cartesian coordinate system $\mathbb{R}^3$ with coordinates $(x, y, z)$ and standard basis or unit vectors of axes $\{\mathbf e_x, \mathbf e_y, \mathbf e_z \}$, del is written as:

$$\nabla = \mathbf{e}_x {\partial \over \partial x} + \mathbf{e}_y {\partial \over \partial y} + \mathbf{e}_z {\partial \over \partial z}= \left({\partial \over \partial x}, {\partial \over \partial y}, {\partial \over \partial z} \right)$$

As a vector operator, del naturally acts on scalar fields via scalar multiplication, and naturally acts on vector fields via dot products and cross products.

More specifically, in three dimensions, for any scalar field $f$ and any vector field $\mathbf{F}=(F_x, F_y, F_z)$, if one defines

$$\left(\mathbf{e}_i {\partial \over \partial x_i}\right) f := {\partial \over \partial x_i}(\mathbf{e}_i f) = {\partial f \over \partial x_i}\mathbf{e}_i$$
$$\left(\mathbf{e}_i {\partial \over \partial x_i}\right) \cdot \mathbf{F} := {\partial \over \partial x_i}(\mathbf{e}_i\cdot \mathbf{F}) = {\partial F_i \over \partial x_i}$$
$$\left(\mathbf{e}_x {\partial \over \partial x}\right) \times \mathbf{F} := {\partial \over \partial x}(\mathbf{e}_x\times \mathbf{F}) = {\partial \over \partial x}(0, -F_z, F_y)$$
$$\left(\mathbf{e}_y {\partial \over \partial y}\right) \times \mathbf{F} := {\partial \over \partial y}(\mathbf{e}_y\times \mathbf{F}) = {\partial \over \partial y}(F_z,0,-F_x)$$
$$\left(\mathbf{e}_z {\partial \over \partial z}\right) \times \mathbf{F} := {\partial \over \partial z}(\mathbf{e}_z\times \mathbf{F}) = {\partial \over \partial z}(-F_y,F_x,0),$$

then using the above definition of $\nabla$, one may write

$$\nabla f =\left(\mathbf{e}_x {\partial \over \partial x}\right)f + \left(\mathbf{e}_y {\partial \over \partial y}\right)f + \left(\mathbf{e}_z {\partial \over \partial z}\right)f = {\partial f \over \partial x}\mathbf{e}_x + {\partial f \over \partial y}\mathbf{e}_y + {\partial f \over \partial z}\mathbf{e}_z$$

and

$$\nabla \cdot \mathbf{F} = \left(\mathbf{e}_x {\partial \over \partial x}\cdot \mathbf{F}\right) + \left(\mathbf{e}_y {\partial \over \partial y}\cdot \mathbf{F}\right) + \left(\mathbf{e}_z {\partial \over \partial z}\cdot \mathbf{F}\right)= {\partial F_x \over \partial x} + {\partial F_y \over \partial y} +  {\partial F_z \over \partial z}$$

and

$$\begin{align}
\nabla \times \mathbf{F} &= \left(\mathbf{e}_x {\partial \over \partial x}\times \mathbf{F}\right) + \left(\mathbf{e}_y {\partial \over \partial y}\times \mathbf{F}\right) + \left(\mathbf{e}_z {\partial \over \partial z}\times \mathbf{F}\right)\\
&= {\partial \over \partial x}(0, -F_z, F_y) + {\partial \over \partial y}(F_z,0,-F_x) + {\partial \over \partial z}(-F_y,F_x,0)\\
&= \left( \text{ } \frac{\partial F_z}{\partial y}-\frac{\partial F_y}{\partial z} \right)\mathbf{e}_x + \left( \text{ } \frac{\partial F_x}{\partial z}-\frac{\partial F_z}{\partial x} \right)\mathbf{e}_y + \left( \text{ } \frac{\partial F_y}{\partial x}-\frac{\partial F_x}{\partial y} \right)\mathbf{e}_z
\end{align}$$

Example:
$$f(x, y, z) = x + y + z$$
$$\nabla f = \mathbf{e}_x {\partial f \over \partial x} + \mathbf{e}_y {\partial f \over \partial y} + \mathbf{e}_z {\partial f \over \partial z} = \left(1, 1, 1 \right)$$

Del can also be expressed in other coordinate systems, see for example del in cylindrical and spherical coordinates.

== Notational uses ==
Del is used as a shorthand form to simplify many long mathematical expressions. It is most commonly used to simplify expressions for the gradient, divergence, curl, directional derivative, and Laplacian.

=== Gradient ===
The vector derivative of a scalar field $f$ is called the gradient, and it can be represented as:

$$\nabla f = {\partial f \over \partial x} \hat\mathbf x + {\partial f \over \partial y} \hat\mathbf y + {\partial f \over \partial z} \hat\mathbf z=\operatorname{grad}f$$

It always points in the direction of greatest increase of $f$, and it has a magnitude equal to the maximum rate of increase at the point. In particular, if a hill is defined as a height function over a plane $h(x,y)$, the gradient at a given location will be a vector in the xy-plane (visualizable as an arrow on a map) pointing along the steepest direction. The magnitude of the gradient is the value of this steepest slope.

In particular, this notation is powerful because the gradient product rule looks very similar to the 1d-derivative case:

$$\nabla(f g) = f \nabla g + g \nabla f$$

However, the rules for dot products do not turn out to be simple, as illustrated by:

$$\nabla (\mathbf u \cdot \mathbf v) = (\mathbf u \cdot \nabla) \mathbf v + (\mathbf v \cdot \nabla) \mathbf u + \mathbf u \times (\nabla \times \mathbf v) + \mathbf v \times (\nabla \times \mathbf u)$$

=== Divergence ===
The divergence of a vector field $\mathbf v(x, y, z) = v_x \hat\mathbf x + v_y \hat\mathbf y + v_z \hat\mathbf z$ is a scalar field that can be represented as:

$$\operatorname{div}\mathbf v = {\partial v_x \over \partial x} + {\partial v_y \over \partial y} + {\partial v_z \over \partial z} = \nabla \cdot \mathbf v$$

The divergence is roughly a measure of a vector field's increase in the direction it points; but more accurately, it is a measure of that field's tendency to converge toward or diverge from a point.

The power of the del notation is shown by the following product rule:

$$\nabla \cdot (f \mathbf v) = (\nabla f) \cdot \mathbf v + f (\nabla \cdot \mathbf v)$$

The formula for the vector product is slightly less intuitive, because this product is not commutative:

$$\nabla \cdot (\mathbf u \times \mathbf v) = (\nabla \times \mathbf u) \cdot \mathbf v - \mathbf u \cdot (\nabla \times \mathbf v)$$

=== Curl ===
The curl of a vector field $\mathbf v(x, y, z) = v_x\hat\mathbf x + v_y\hat\mathbf y + v_z\hat\mathbf z$ is a vector function that can be represented as:

$$\operatorname{curl}\mathbf v = \left({\partial v_z \over \partial y} - {\partial v_y \over \partial z} \right) \hat\mathbf x + \left({\partial v_x \over \partial z} - {\partial v_z \over \partial x} \right) \hat\mathbf y + \left({\partial v_y \over \partial x} - {\partial v_x \over \partial y} \right) \hat\mathbf z = \nabla \times \mathbf v$$

The curl at a point is proportional to the on-axis torque that a tiny pinwheel would be subjected to if it were centered at that point.

The vector product operation can be visualized as a pseudo-determinant:

$$\nabla \times \mathbf v = \left|\begin{matrix} \hat\mathbf x & \hat\mathbf y & \hat\mathbf z \\[2pt] {\frac{\partial}{\partial x}} & {\frac{\partial}{\partial y}} & {\frac{\partial}{\partial z}} \\[2pt] v_x & v_y & v_z \end{matrix}\right|$$

Again the power of the notation is shown by the product rule:

$$\nabla \times (f \mathbf v) = (\nabla f) \times \mathbf v + f (\nabla \times \mathbf v)$$

The rule for the vector product does not turn out to be simple:

$$\nabla \times (\mathbf u \times \mathbf v) = \mathbf u \, (\nabla \cdot \mathbf v) - \mathbf v \, (\nabla \cdot \mathbf u) + (\mathbf v \cdot \nabla) \, \mathbf u - (\mathbf u \cdot \nabla) \, \mathbf v$$

=== Directional derivative ===
The directional derivative of a scalar field $f(x,y,z)$ in the direction $\mathbf a(x,y,z) = a_x \hat\mathbf x + a_y \hat\mathbf y + a_z \hat\mathbf z$ is defined as:

$$(\mathbf a\cdot\nabla)f=\lim_{h \to 0}{\frac{f(x+a_xh,y+a_yh,z+a_zh) - f(x,y,z)}{h}}.$$

Which is equal to the following when the gradient exists

$$\mathbf a\cdot\operatorname{grad}f = a_x {\partial f \over \partial x} + a_y {\partial f \over \partial y} + a_z {\partial f \over \partial z} = \mathbf a \cdot (\nabla f)$$

This gives the rate of change of a field $f$ in the direction of $\mathbf a$, scaled by the magnitude of $\mathbf a$. In operator notation, the element in parentheses can be considered a single coherent unit; fluid dynamics uses this convention extensively, terming it the convective derivative—the "moving" derivative of the fluid.

Note that $(\mathbf a \cdot \nabla)$ is an operator that maps scalars to scalars. It can be extended to act on a vector field by applying the operator to each component of the vector.

=== Laplacian ===
The Laplace operator is a scalar operator that can be applied to either vector or scalar fields; for cartesian coordinate systems it is defined as:

$$\Delta = {\partial^2 \over \partial x^2} + {\partial^2 \over \partial y^2} + {\partial^2 \over \partial z^2} = \nabla \cdot \nabla = \nabla^2$$

and the definition for more general coordinate systems is given in vector Laplacian.

The Laplacian is ubiquitous throughout modern mathematical physics, appearing for example in Laplace's equation, Poisson's equation, the heat equation, the wave equation, and the Schrödinger equation.

=== Hessian matrix ===
While $\nabla^2$ usually represents the Laplacian, sometimes $\nabla^2$ also represents the Hessian matrix. The former refers to the inner product of $\nabla$, while the latter refers to the dyadic product of $\nabla$:

$$\nabla^2 = \nabla \nabla^\text{T}$$.

So whether $\nabla^2$ refers to a Laplacian or a Hessian matrix depends on the context.

=== Tensor derivative ===
Del can also be applied to a vector field with the result being a tensor. The tensor derivative of a vector field $\mathbf{v}$ (in three dimensions) is a 9-term second-rank tensor – that is, a 3×3 matrix – but can be denoted simply as $\nabla \otimes \mathbf{v}$, where $\otimes$ represents the dyadic product. This quantity is equivalent to the transpose of the Jacobian matrix of the vector field with respect to space. The divergence of the vector field can then be expressed as the trace of this matrix.

For a small displacement $\delta \mathbf{r}$, the change in the vector field is given by:

$$\delta \mathbf{v} = (\nabla \otimes \mathbf{v})^\text{T} \sdot \delta \mathbf{r}$$

== Product rules ==
For vector calculus:

$$\begin{align}
\nabla (fg) &= f\nabla g + g\nabla f \\
\nabla(\mathbf u \cdot \mathbf v) &= \mathbf u \times (\nabla \times \mathbf v) + \mathbf v \times (\nabla \times \mathbf u) + (\mathbf u \cdot \nabla) \mathbf v + (\mathbf v \cdot \nabla)\mathbf u \\
\nabla \cdot (f \mathbf v) &= f (\nabla \cdot \mathbf v) + \mathbf v \cdot (\nabla f) \\
\nabla \cdot (\mathbf u \times \mathbf v) &= \mathbf v \cdot (\nabla \times \mathbf u) - \mathbf u \cdot (\nabla \times \mathbf v) \\
\nabla \times (f \mathbf v) &= (\nabla f) \times \mathbf v + f (\nabla \times \mathbf v) \\
\nabla \times (\mathbf u \times \mathbf v) &= \mathbf u \, (\nabla \cdot \mathbf v) - \mathbf v \, (\nabla \cdot \mathbf u) + (\mathbf v \cdot \nabla) \, \mathbf u - (\mathbf u \cdot \nabla) \, \mathbf v
\end{align}$$

In dyadic and matrix notations (where in the latter $\mathbf u \cdot \mathbf v$ is written as $\mathbf u^\text{T} \mathbf v$, $\mathbf u \otimes \mathbf v$ as $\mathbf u \mathbf v^\text{T}$, and $\nabla \mathbf u$ as $\nabla \mathbf u^\text{T}$ (Note: Following are rules for translation of products from dyadic to matrix notations. Here, f and g are scalars, u and v are vectors, A and B are dyadics, and ∇ may be substituted for any vector. Each term in a matrix equation must make sense as a product of matrices, and all terms must have the same dimensions. Vector and scalar: vf = v(f), and fv = [(f)v^{T}]^{T}. Vector and vector: u·v = u^{T}v, and uv or u⊗v = uv^{T}. Dyadic and vector: A·v = Av, and v·A = (v^{T}A)^{T}. Dyadic and dyadic: A·B = AB. The usual rules of matrix algebra do not hold with differential operators. E.g., ∇[(f)(g)] ≠ [∇(f)](g), and [∇(f)]^{T} ≠ (f)^{T}∇^{T}. One must follow the rules strictly, to avoid mistakes. E.g., the equation (∇u)^{T}·v = (v·∇)u translates as (∇u^{T})^{T}v = [(v^{T}∇)u^{T}]^{T}.)), respectively:

$$\begin{align}
\nabla (\mathbf u \cdot \mathbf v) &= (\nabla \mathbf u) \cdot \mathbf v + (\nabla \mathbf v) \cdot \mathbf u \\
\nabla \left(\mathbf u^\text{T}\mathbf v\right) &= \left(\nabla \mathbf u^\text{T}\right) \mathbf v + \left(\nabla \mathbf v^\text{T}\right) \mathbf u
\end{align}$$

Another relation of interest (see e.g. Euler equations) is the following (where $\mathbf u \otimes \mathbf v$ is the outer product tensor):

$$\begin{align}
\nabla \cdot (\mathbf u \otimes \mathbf v) &= (\nabla \cdot \mathbf u) \mathbf v + (\mathbf u \cdot \nabla) \mathbf v \\
\nabla^\text{T} \left(\mathbf u \mathbf v^\text{T}\right) &= \left(\nabla^\text{T} \mathbf u\right) \mathbf v^\text{T} + \left(\mathbf u^\text{T} \nabla\right) \mathbf v^\text{T}
\end{align}$$

== Second derivatives ==
DCG chart: A simple chart depicting all rules pertaining to second derivatives. D, C, G, L and CC stand for divergence, curl, gradient, Laplacian and curl of curl, respectively. Arrows indicate existence of second derivatives. Blue circle in the middle represents curl of curl, whereas the other two red circles (dashed) mean that DD and GG do not exist.

When del operates on a scalar or vector, either a scalar or vector is returned. Because of the diversity of vector products (scalar, dot, cross) one application of del already gives rise to three major derivatives: the gradient (scalar product), divergence (dot product), and curl (cross product). Applying these three sorts of derivatives again to each other gives five possible second derivatives, for a scalar field f or a vector field v; the use of the scalar Laplacian and vector Laplacian gives two more:

$$\begin{align}
\operatorname{div}(\operatorname{grad}f) &= \nabla \cdot (\nabla f) = \nabla^2 f \\
\operatorname{curl}(\operatorname{grad}f) &= \nabla \times (\nabla f) \\
\operatorname{grad}(\operatorname{div}\mathbf v) &= \nabla (\nabla \cdot \mathbf v) \\
\operatorname{div}(\operatorname{curl}\mathbf v) &= \nabla \cdot (\nabla \times \mathbf v) \\
\operatorname{curl}(\operatorname{curl}\mathbf v) &= \nabla \times (\nabla \times \mathbf v) \\
\Delta f &= \nabla^2 f \\
\Delta \mathbf v &= \nabla^2 \mathbf v
\end{align}$$

These are of interest principally because they are not always unique or independent of each other. As long as the functions are well-behaved ($C^\infty$ in most cases), two of them are always zero:

$$\begin{align}
\operatorname{curl}(\operatorname{grad}f) &= \nabla \times (\nabla f) = 0 \\
\operatorname{div}(\operatorname{curl}\mathbf v) &= \nabla \cdot (\nabla \times \mathbf v) = 0
\end{align}$$

Two of them are always equal:

$$\operatorname{div}(\operatorname{grad}f) = \nabla \cdot (\nabla f) = \nabla^2 f = \Delta f$$

The 3 remaining vector derivatives are related by the equation:

$$\nabla \times \left(\nabla \times \mathbf v\right) = \nabla (\nabla \cdot \mathbf v) - \nabla^2 \mathbf{v}$$

And one of them can even be expressed with the tensor product and the Feynman subscript notation, if the functions are well-behaved:

$\nabla (\nabla \cdot \mathbf v) = \nabla_\mathbf{v} \cdot (\mathbf v \otimes \nabla_\mathbf{v})$ (Note: In matrix notation, and omitting the subscripts, we have, [∇(∇^{T}v)]^{T} = (∇^{T}v)^{T}∇^{T} = (∇^{T}v)∇^{T} = ∇^{T}(v∇^{T}).)

== Precautions ==
Most of the above vector properties (except for those that rely explicitly on del's differential properties—for example, the product rule) rely only on symbol rearrangement, and must necessarily hold if the del symbol is replaced by any other vector. This is part of the value to be gained in notationally representing this operator as a vector.

Though one can often replace del with a vector and obtain a vector identity, making those identities mnemonic, the reverse is not necessarily reliable, because del does not commute in general.

A counterexample that demonstrates the divergence ($\nabla \cdot \mathbf v$) and the advection operator ($\mathbf v \cdot \nabla$) are not commutative:

$$\begin{align}
(\mathbf u \cdot \mathbf v) f &\equiv (\mathbf v \cdot \mathbf u) f \\
(\nabla \cdot \mathbf v) f &= \left (\frac{\partial v_x}{\partial x} + \frac{\partial v_y}{\partial y} + \frac{\partial v_z}{\partial z} \right)f
= \frac{\partial v_x}{\partial x}f + \frac{\partial v_y}{\partial y}f + \frac{\partial v_z}{\partial z}f \\
(\mathbf v \cdot \nabla) f &= \left (v_x \frac{\partial}{\partial x} + v_y \frac{\partial}{\partial y} + v_z \frac{\partial}{\partial z} \right)f
= v_x \frac{\partial f}{\partial x} + v_y \frac{\partial f}{\partial y} + v_z \frac{\partial f}{\partial z} \\
\Rightarrow (\nabla \cdot \mathbf v) f &\ne (\mathbf v \cdot \nabla) f \\
\end{align}$$

A counterexample that relies on del's differential properties:

$$\begin{align}
(\nabla x) \times (\nabla y) &= \left (\mathbf e_x \frac{\partial x}{\partial x}+\mathbf e_y \frac{\partial x}{\partial y}+\mathbf e_z \frac{\partial x}{\partial z} \right) \times \left (\mathbf e_x \frac{\partial y}{\partial x}+\mathbf e_y \frac{\partial y}{\partial y}+\mathbf e_z \frac{\partial y}{\partial z} \right) \\
&= (\mathbf e_x \cdot 1 +\mathbf e_y \cdot 0+\mathbf e_z \cdot 0) \times (\mathbf e_x \cdot 0+\mathbf e_y \cdot 1+\mathbf e_z \cdot 0) \\
&= \mathbf e_x  \times \mathbf e_y \\
&= \mathbf e_z \\
(\mathbf u x)\times (\mathbf u y) &= x y (\mathbf u \times \mathbf u) \\
&= x y \mathbf 0 \\
&= \mathbf 0
\end{align}$$

Central to these distinctions is the fact that del is not simply a vector; it is a vector operator. Whereas a vector is an object with both a magnitude and direction, del has neither a magnitude nor a direction until it operates on a function.

For that reason, identities involving del must be derived with care, using both vector identities and differentiation identities such as the product rule.

== See also ==
- Del in cylindrical and spherical coordinates
- Dirac operator
- Maxwell's equations
- Nabla symbol
- Navier–Stokes equations
- Notation for differentiation
- Quabla operator
- Table of mathematical symbols
- Vector calculus identities
