= Divergence =

Vector operator in vector calculus

The divergence of different vector fields. The divergence of vectors from point (x,y) equals the sum of the partial derivative-with-respect-to-x of the x-component and the partial derivative-with-respect-to-y of the y-component at that point: $\nabla\!\cdot(\mathbf{V}(x,y)) = \frac{\partial\, {V_x(x,y)}}{\partial{x}}+\frac{\partial\, {V_y(x,y)}}{\partial{y}}$

In vector calculus, divergence is a vector operator that operates on a vector field, producing a scalar field giving the rate that the vector field alters the volume in an infinitesimal neighborhood of each point. (In 2D this "volume" refers to area.) More precisely, the divergence at a point is the rate that the flow of the vector field modifies a volume about the point in the limit, as a small volume shrinks down to the point.

As an example, consider air as it is heated or cooled. The velocity of the air at each point defines a vector field. While air is heated in a region, it expands in all directions, and thus the velocity field points outward from that region. The divergence of the velocity field in that region would thus have a positive value. While the air is cooled and thus contracting, the divergence of the velocity has a negative value.

== Physical interpretation of divergence ==
In physical terms, the divergence of a vector field is the extent to which the vector field flux behaves like a source or a sink at a given point. It is a local measure of its "outgoingness" – the extent to which there are more of the field vectors exiting from an infinitesimal region of space than entering it. A point at which the flux is outgoing has positive divergence, and is often called a "source" of the field. A point at which the flux is directed inward has negative divergence, and is often called a "sink" of the field. The greater the flux of field through a small surface enclosing a given point, the greater the value of divergence at that point. A point at which there is zero flux through an enclosing surface has zero divergence.

The divergence of a vector field is often illustrated using the simple example of the velocity field of a fluid, a liquid or gas. A moving gas has a velocity, a speed and direction at each point, which can be represented by a vector, so the velocity of the gas forms a vector field. If a gas is heated, it will expand. This will cause a net motion of gas particles outward in all directions. Any closed surface in the gas will enclose gas which is expanding, so there will be an outward flux of gas through the surface. So the velocity field will have positive divergence everywhere. Similarly, if the gas is cooled, it will contract. There will be more room for gas particles in any volume, so the external pressure of the fluid will cause a net flow of gas volume inward through any closed surface. Therefore, the velocity field has negative divergence everywhere. In contrast, in a gas at a constant temperature and pressure, the net flux of gas out of any closed surface is zero. The gas may be moving, but the volume rate of gas flowing into any closed surface must equal the volume rate flowing out, so the net flux is zero. Thus the gas velocity has zero divergence everywhere. A field which has zero divergence everywhere is called solenoidal.

If the gas is heated only at one point or small region, or a small tube is introduced which supplies a source of additional gas at one point, the gas there will expand, pushing fluid particles around it outward in all directions. This will cause an outward velocity field throughout the gas, centered on the heated point. Any closed surface enclosing the heated point will have a flux of gas particles passing out of it, so there is positive divergence at that point. However any closed surface not enclosing the point will have a constant density of gas inside, so just as many fluid particles are entering as leaving the volume, thus the net flux out of the volume is zero. Therefore, the divergence at any other point is zero.

== Definition ==
The divergence at a point x is the limit of the ratio of the flux $\Phi$ through the surface S_{i} (red arrows) to the volume $|V_i|$ for any sequence of closed regions V_{1}, V_{2}, V_{3}, … enclosing x that approaches zero volume: $\operatorname{div} \mathbf{F} = \lim_{|V_i| \to 0} \frac{\Phi(S_i)}{|V_i|}$

The divergence of a vector field F(x) at a point x_{0} is defined as the limit of the ratio of the surface integral of F out of the closed surface of a volume V enclosing x_{0} to the volume of V, as V shrinks to zero

$\left. \operatorname{div} \mathbf{F} \right|_\mathbf{x_0} = \lim_{V \to 0} \frac{1}{|V|}$ $\scriptstyle S(V)$ $\mathbf{F} \cdot \mathbf{\hat n} \, dS$

where |V| is the volume of V, S(V) is the boundary of V, and $\mathbf{\hat n}$ is the outward unit normal to that surface. It can be shown that the above limit always converges to the same value for any sequence of volumes that contain x_{0} and approach zero volume. The result, div F, is a scalar function of x.

Since this definition is coordinate-free, it shows that the divergence is the same in any coordinate system. However the above definition is not often used practically to calculate divergence; when the vector field is given in a coordinate system the coordinate definitions below are much simpler to use.

A vector field with zero divergence everywhere is called solenoidal – in which case any closed surface has no net flux across it. This is the same as saying that the (flow of the) vector field preserves volume: The volume of any region does not change after it has been transported by the flow for any period of time.

== Definition in coordinates ==
=== Cartesian coordinates ===
In three-dimensional Cartesian coordinates, the divergence of a continuously differentiable vector field $\mathbf{F} = F_x\mathbf{i} + F_y\mathbf{j} + F_z\mathbf{k}$ is defined as the scalar-valued function:

$$\operatorname{div} \mathbf{F} = \nabla\cdot\mathbf{F} = \left(\frac{\partial}{\partial x}, \frac{\partial}{\partial y}, \frac{\partial}{\partial z} \right) \cdot (F_x,F_y,F_z) = \frac{\partial F_x}{\partial x}+\frac{\partial F_y}{\partial y}+\frac{\partial F_z}{\partial z}.$$

Although expressed in terms of coordinates, the result is invariant under rotations, as the physical interpretation suggests. Here, we note that the divergence can be equivalently calculated as the trace of the Jacobian matrix of F, which can be found as the sum of its eigenvalues. Applying a rotation to F—a linear transformation by a matrix in the orthogonal group with determinant 1—does not scale the eigenvalues of neither F nor its Jacobian, and thus the divergence, too, is invariant under any rotation.

The common notation for the divergence (∇ · F) is a convenient mnemonic, where the dot denotes an operation reminiscent of the dot product: take the components of the ∇ operator (see del), apply them to the corresponding components of F, and sum the results. Because applying an operator is different from multiplying the components, this is considered an abuse of notation.

=== Cylindrical coordinates ===
For a vector expressed in local unit cylindrical coordinates as
$$\mathbf{F} = \mathbf{e}_r F_r + \mathbf{e}_\theta F_\theta + \mathbf{e}_z F_z,$$
where e_{a} is the unit vector in direction a, the divergence is (Note: Cylindrical coordinates at Wolfram Mathworld)
$$\operatorname{div} \mathbf F = \nabla \cdot \mathbf{F} = \frac{1}{r} \frac{\partial}{\partial r} \left(r F_r\right) + \frac1r \frac{\partial F_\theta}{\partial\theta} + \frac{\partial F_z}{\partial z}.$$

The use of local coordinates is vital for the validity of the expression. If we consider x the position vector and the functions r(x), θ(x), and z(x), which assign the corresponding global cylindrical coordinate to a vector, in general $r(\mathbf{F}(\mathbf{x})) \neq F_r(\mathbf{x})$, $\theta(\mathbf{F}(\mathbf{x})) \neq F_{\theta}(\mathbf{x})$, and $z(\mathbf{F}(\mathbf{x})) \neq F_z(\mathbf{x})$. In particular, if we consider the identity function F(x) = x, we find that:

$$\theta(\mathbf{F}(\mathbf{x})) = \theta \neq F_{\theta}(\mathbf{x}) = 0.$$

=== Spherical coordinates ===
In spherical coordinates, with θ the angle with the z axis and φ the rotation around the z axis, and F again written in local unit coordinates, the divergence is (Note: Spherical coordinates at Wolfram Mathworld) $\operatorname{div}\mathbf{F} = \nabla \cdot \mathbf{F} = \frac{1}{r^2} \frac{\partial}{\partial r} \left(r^2 F_r\right) + \frac{1}{r\sin\theta} \frac{\partial}{\partial \theta} \left(\sin\theta\, F_\theta\right) + \frac{1}{r \sin\theta} \frac{\partial F_\varphi}{\partial \varphi}.$

=== Tensor field ===
Let $\boldsymbol{\mathsf{A}}$ be continuously differentiable second-order tensor field defined as follows:

$$\boldsymbol{\mathsf{A}} = \begin{bmatrix}
A_{11} & A_{12} & A_{13} \\
A_{21} & A_{22} & A_{23} \\
A_{31} & A_{32} & A_{33}
\end{bmatrix}$$

The divergence of a second-order tensor represents a contraction, and the result is a first-order tensor field (i.e., classically, a vector). Somewhat unfortunately, for Cartesian coordinates the operation has been routinely defined in two different ways. The first is given by (noting there is no sum over the repeated index of the basis vectors)

$$\operatorname{div} \boldsymbol{\mathsf{A}}
=\nabla\cdot(\boldsymbol{\mathsf{A}}^\mathsf{T})= \frac{\partial A_{ji}}{\partial x_i}~\mathbf{e}_j = A_{ji,i}~\mathbf{e}_j
= \begin{bmatrix}
\dfrac{\partial A_{11}}{\partial x_1} +\dfrac{\partial A_{12}}{\partial x_2} +\dfrac{\partial A_{13}}{\partial x_3} \\
\dfrac{\partial A_{21}}{\partial x_1} +\dfrac{\partial A_{22}}{\partial x_2} +\dfrac{\partial A_{23}}{\partial x_3} \\
\dfrac{\partial A_{31}}{\partial x_1} +\dfrac{\partial A_{32}}{\partial x_2} +\dfrac{\partial A_{33}}{\partial x_3}
\end{bmatrix}$$

and the second (more common) form by

$$\operatorname{div}{\boldsymbol{\mathsf{A}}} =\nabla \cdot \boldsymbol{\mathsf{A}} = \frac{\partial A_{ij}}{\partial x_i} ~\mathbf{e}_j = A_{ij,i}~\mathbf{e}_j =
\begin{bmatrix}
\dfrac{\partial A_{11}}{\partial x_1} + \dfrac{\partial A_{21}}{\partial x_2} + \dfrac{\partial A_{31}}{\partial x_3} \\
\dfrac{\partial A_{12}}{\partial x_1} + \dfrac{\partial A_{22}}{\partial x_2} + \dfrac{\partial A_{32}}{\partial x_3} \\
\dfrac{\partial A_{13}}{\partial x_1} + \dfrac{\partial A_{23}}{\partial x_2} + \dfrac{\partial A_{33}}{\partial x_3} \\
\end{bmatrix}$$

The second of these was the form suggested by the progenitor of vector algebra, J. Willard Gibbs; thus if one is following Gibbsian notation strictly, this should be the form adopted. Note that if a tensor is symmetric A_{ij} = A_{ji} then the two forms are equivalent. Because of this, often in the literature the two definitions (and symbols div and $\nabla \cdot$) are used interchangeably (especially in mechanics equations where tensor symmetry is usually assumed).

Expressions of $\boldsymbol{\mathsf{A}}$ in cylindrical and spherical coordinates are given in the article del in cylindrical and spherical coordinates; that article adopts the second of the two definitions above.

=== General coordinates ===
Using Einstein notation we can consider the divergence in general coordinates, which we write as x^{1}, …, x^{i}, …, x^{n}, where n is the number of dimensions of the domain. Here, the upper index refers to the number of the coordinate or component, so x^{2} refers to the second component, and not the quantity x squared. The index variable i is used to refer to an arbitrary component, such as x^{i}. The Voss-Weyl formula, which allows the divergence to be determined using simply partial coordinate derivatives, is as follows:

$$\operatorname{div}(\mathbf{F}) = \frac{1}{\rho} \frac{\partial {\left(\rho \, F^i\right)}}{\partial x^i},$$

where $\rho$ is the local coefficient of the volume element and F^{i} are the components of $\mathbf{F} = F^i\mathbf{e}_i$ with respect to the local unnormalized covariant basis (sometimes written as $\mathbf{e}_i = \partial\mathbf{x} / \partial x^i$). The Einstein notation implies summation over i, since it appears as both an upper and lower index.

The volume coefficient ρ is a function of position which depends on the coordinate system. In Cartesian, cylindrical and spherical coordinates, using the same conventions as before, we have ρ = 1, ρ = r and ρ = r^{2} sin θ, respectively. The volume can also be expressed as $\rho = \sqrt{\left|\det g_{ab}\right|}$, where g_{ab} is the metric tensor. The determinant appears because it provides the appropriate invariant definition of the volume, given a set of vectors. Since the determinant is a scalar quantity which doesn't depend on the indices, these can be suppressed, writing $\rho = \sqrt{\left|\det g\right|}$. The absolute value is taken in order to handle the general case where the determinant might be negative, such as in pseudo-Riemannian spaces. The reason for the square-root is a bit subtle: it effectively avoids double-counting as one goes from curved to Cartesian coordinates, and back. The volume (the determinant) can also be understood as the Jacobian of the transformation from Cartesian to curvilinear coordinates, which for n = 3 gives $\rho = \left| \frac{\partial(x,y,z)}{\partial (x^1,x^2,x^3)}\right|$.

Some conventions expect all local basis elements to be normalized to unit length, as was done in the previous sections. If we write $\hat{\mathbf{e}}_i$ for the normalized basis, and $\hat{F}^i$ for the components of F with respect to it, we have that
$$\mathbf{F} = F^i \mathbf{e}_i =
F^i \|{\mathbf{e}_i }\| \frac{\mathbf{e}_i}{\| \mathbf{e}_i \|} =
F^i \sqrt{g_{ii}} \, \hat{\mathbf{e}}_i =
\hat{F}^i \hat{\mathbf{e}}_i,$$
using one of the properties of the metric tensor. By dotting both sides of the last equality with the contravariant element $\hat{\mathbf{e}}^i$, we can conclude that $F^i = \hat{F}^i / \sqrt{g_{ii}}$. After substituting, the formula becomes:

$$\operatorname{div}(\mathbf{F}) = \frac 1{\rho} \frac{\partial \left(\frac{\rho}{\sqrt{g_{ii}}}\hat{F}^i\right)}{\partial x^i} =
\frac 1{\sqrt{\det g}} \frac{\partial \left(\sqrt{\frac{\det g}{g_{ii}}}\,\hat{F}^i\right)}{\partial x^i}.$$

See § In curvilinear coordinates for further discussion.

== Properties ==
The following properties can all be derived from the ordinary differentiation rules of calculus. Most importantly, the divergence is a linear operator, i.e.,

$$\operatorname{div}(a\mathbf{F} + b\mathbf{G}) = a \operatorname{div} \mathbf{F} + b \operatorname{div} \mathbf{G}$$

for all vector fields F and G and all real numbers a and b.

There is a product rule of the following type: if φ is a scalar-valued function and F is a vector field, then

$$\operatorname{div}(\varphi \mathbf{F}) = \operatorname{grad} \varphi \cdot \mathbf{F} + \varphi \operatorname{div} \mathbf{F},$$

or in more suggestive notation

$$\nabla\cdot(\varphi \mathbf{F}) = (\nabla\varphi) \cdot \mathbf{F} + \varphi (\nabla\cdot\mathbf{F}).$$

Another product rule for the cross product of two vector fields F and G in three dimensions involves the curl and reads as follows:

$$\operatorname{div}(\mathbf{F}\times\mathbf{G}) = \operatorname{curl} \mathbf{F} \cdot\mathbf{G} - \mathbf{F} \cdot \operatorname{curl} \mathbf{G},$$

or

$$\nabla\cdot(\mathbf{F}\times\mathbf{G}) = (\nabla\times\mathbf{F})\cdot\mathbf{G} - \mathbf{F}\cdot(\nabla\times\mathbf{G}).$$

The Laplacian of a scalar field is the divergence of the field's gradient:

$$\operatorname{div}(\operatorname{grad}\varphi) = \Delta\varphi.$$

The divergence of the curl of any vector field (in three dimensions) is equal to zero:

$$\nabla\cdot(\nabla\times\mathbf{F})=0.$$

If a vector field F with zero divergence is defined on a ball in R^{3}, then there exists some vector field G on the ball with F = curl G. For regions in R^{3} more topologically complicated than this, the latter statement might be false (see Poincaré lemma). The degree of failure of the truth of the statement, measured by the homology of the chain complex

$$\{ \text{scalar fields on } U \} ~ \overset{\operatorname{grad}}{\rarr} ~ \{ \text{vector fields on } U \} ~ \overset{\operatorname{curl}}{\rarr} ~ \{ \text{vector fields on } U \} ~ \overset{\operatorname{div}}{\rarr} ~ \{ \text{scalar fields on } U \}$$

serves as a nice quantification of the complicatedness of the underlying region U. These are the beginnings and main motivations of de Rham cohomology.

== Decomposition theorem ==
It can be shown that any stationary flux v(r) that is twice continuously differentiable in R^{3} and vanishes sufficiently fast for |r| → ∞ can be decomposed uniquely into an irrotational part E(r) and a source-free part B(r). Moreover, these parts are explicitly determined by the respective source densities (see above) and circulation densities (see the article Curl):

For the irrotational part one has

$$\mathbf E=-\nabla \Phi(\mathbf r),$$

with

$$\Phi (\mathbf{r})=\int_{\mathbb R^3}\,d^3\mathbf r'\;\frac{\operatorname{div} \mathbf{v}(\mathbf{r}')}{4\pi\left|\mathbf{r}-\mathbf{r}'\right|}.$$

The source-free part, B, can be similarly written: one only has to replace the scalar potential Φ(r) by a vector potential A(r) and the terms −∇Φ by +∇ × A, and the source density div v by the circulation density ∇ × v.

This "decomposition theorem" is a by-product of the stationary case of electrodynamics. It is a special case of the more general Helmholtz decomposition, which works in dimensions greater than three as well.

== In arbitrary finite dimensions ==
The divergence of a vector field can be defined in any finite number $n$ of dimensions. If

$$\mathbf{F} = (F_1 , F_2 , \ldots F_n) ,$$

in a Euclidean coordinate system with coordinates x_{1}, x_{2}, ..., x_{n}, define

$$\operatorname{div} \mathbf{F} = \nabla\cdot\mathbf{F} = \frac{\partial F_1}{\partial x_1} + \frac{\partial F_2}{\partial x_2} + \cdots + \frac{\partial F_n}{\partial x_n}.$$

In the 1D case, F reduces to a regular function, and the divergence reduces to the derivative.

For any n, the divergence is a linear operator, and it satisfies the "product rule"

$$\nabla\cdot(\varphi \mathbf{F}) = (\nabla\varphi) \cdot \mathbf{F} + \varphi (\nabla\cdot\mathbf{F})$$

for any scalar-valued function φ.

== Relation to the exterior derivative ==
One can express the divergence as a particular case of the exterior derivative, which takes a 2-form to a 3-form in R^{3}. Define the current two-form as

$$j = F_1 \, dy \wedge dz + F_2 \, dz \wedge dx + F_3 \, dx \wedge dy .$$

It measures the amount of "stuff" flowing through a surface per unit time in a "stuff fluid" of density ρ = 1 dx ∧ dy ∧ dz moving with local velocity F. Its exterior derivative dj is then given by

$$dj = \left(\frac{\partial F_1}{\partial x} +\frac{\partial F_2}{\partial y} +\frac{\partial F_3}{\partial z} \right) dx \wedge dy \wedge dz = (\nabla \cdot {\mathbf F}) \rho$$

where $\wedge$ is the wedge product.

Thus, the divergence of the vector field F can be expressed as:

$$\nabla \cdot {\mathbf F} = {\star} d{\star} \big({\mathbf F}^\flat \big) .$$

Here the superscript ♭ is one of the two musical isomorphisms, and ⋆ is the Hodge star operator. When the divergence is written in this way, the operator ${\star} d{\star}$ is referred to as the codifferential. Working with the current two-form and the exterior derivative is usually easier than working with the vector field and divergence, because unlike the divergence, the exterior derivative commutes with a change of (curvilinear) coordinate system.

== In curvilinear coordinates ==
The appropriate expression is more complicated in curvilinear coordinates. The divergence of a vector field extends naturally to any differentiable manifold of dimension n that has a volume form (or density) μ, e.g. a Riemannian or Lorentzian manifold. Generalising the construction of a two-form for a vector field on R^{3}, on such a manifold a vector field X defines an (n − 1)-form j = i_{X} μ obtained by contracting X with μ. The divergence is then the function defined by

$$dj = (\operatorname{div} X) \mu .$$

The divergence can be defined in terms of the Lie derivative as

$${\mathcal L}_X \mu = (\operatorname{div} X) \mu .$$

This means that the divergence measures the rate of expansion of a unit of volume (a volume element) as it flows with the vector field.

On a pseudo-Riemannian manifold, the divergence with respect to the volume can be expressed in terms of the Levi-Civita connection ∇:

$$\operatorname{div} X = \nabla \cdot X = {X^a}_{;a} ,$$

where the second expression is the contraction of the vector field valued 1-form ∇X with itself and the last expression is the traditional coordinate expression from Ricci calculus.

An equivalent expression without using a connection is

$$\operatorname{div}(X) = \frac{1}{\sqrt{\left|\det g \right|}} \, \partial_a \left(\sqrt{\left|\det g \right|} \, X^a\right),$$

where g is the metric and $\partial_a$ denotes the partial derivative with respect to coordinate x^{a}. The square-root of the (absolute value of the determinant of the) metric appears because the divergence must be written with the correct conception of the volume. In curvilinear coordinates, the basis vectors are no longer orthonormal; the determinant encodes the correct idea of volume in this case. It appears twice, here, once, so that the $X^a$ can be transformed into "flat space" (where coordinates are actually orthonormal), and once again so that $\partial_a$ is also transformed into "flat space", so that finally, the "ordinary" divergence can be written with the "ordinary" concept of volume in flat space (i.e. unit volume, i.e. one, i.e. not written down). The square-root appears in the denominator, because the derivative transforms in the opposite way (contravariantly) to the vector (which is covariant). This idea of getting to a "flat coordinate system" where local computations can be done in a conventional way is called a vielbein. A different way to see this is to note that the divergence is the codifferential in disguise. That is, the divergence corresponds to the expression $\star d\star$ with $d$ the differential and $\star$ the Hodge star. The Hodge star, by its construction, causes the volume form to appear in all of the right places.

== The divergence of tensors ==
Divergence can also be generalised to tensors. In Einstein notation, the divergence of a contravariant vector F^{μ} is given by

$$\nabla \cdot \mathbf{F} = \nabla_\mu F^\mu ,$$

where ∇_{μ} denotes the covariant derivative. In this general setting, the correct formulation of the divergence is to recognize that it is a codifferential; the appropriate properties follow from there.

Equivalently, some authors define the divergence of a mixed tensor by using the musical isomorphism ♯: if T is a (p, q)-tensor (p for the contravariant vector and q for the covariant one), then we define the divergence of T to be the (p, q − 1)-tensor

$$(\operatorname{div} T) (Y_1 , \ldots , Y_{q-1}) = {\operatorname{trace}} \Big(X \mapsto \sharp (\nabla T) (X , \cdot , Y_1 , \ldots , Y_{q-1}) \Big);$$

that is, we take the trace over the first two covariant indices of the covariant derivative. (Note: The choice of "first" covariant index of a tensor is intrinsic and depends on the ordering of the terms of the Cartesian product of vector spaces on which the tensor is given as a multilinear map V × V × ... × V → R. But equally well defined choices for the divergence could be made by using other indices. Consequently, it is more natural to specify the divergence of T with respect to a specified index. There are however two important special cases where this choice is essentially irrelevant: with a totally symmetric contravariant tensor, when every choice is equivalent, and with a totally antisymmetric contravariant tensor (a.k.a. a k-vector), when the choice affects only the sign.) The $\sharp$ symbol refers to the musical isomorphism.

== See also ==
- Curl
- Del in cylindrical and spherical coordinates
- Divergence theorem
- Gradient
