= Calculus on manifolds =

Calculus on manifolds may refer to:

- Calculus on Manifolds, an undergraduate real analysis and differential geometry textbook by Michael Spivak
- The generalization of differential and integral calculus to differentiable manifolds. For this, see Calculus on Euclidean space#Calculus on manifolds.

== See also ==
- Differential geometry
