= Advanced calculus =

In mathematics, advanced calculus can refer to

- Multivariable calculus
- Mathematical analysis; specifically, real analysis
- A branch of calculus that goes beyond multivariable calculus; for this, see Calculus on Euclidean space
