= Calculus on Manifolds (book) =

Book by Michael Spivak

- Cover of the first edition
- Author: Michael Spivak
- Language: English
- Subject: Mathematics
- Publisher: Benjamin Cummings
- Publication date: 1965
- Publication place: United States
- Pages: 146
- ISBN: 0-8053-9021-9
- OCLC: 607457141

Calculus on Manifolds: A Modern Approach to Classical Theorems of Advanced Calculus (1965) by Michael Spivak is a brief, rigorous, and modern textbook on multivariable calculus, differential forms, and integration on manifolds for advanced undergraduates.

== Description ==
Calculus on Manifolds is a brief monograph on the theory of vector-valued functions of several real variables ($f: \mathbb{R}^n \mapsto \mathbb{R}^m$) and differentiable manifolds in Euclidean space. In addition to extending the concepts of differentiation (including the inverse and implicit function theorems) and Riemann integration (including Fubini's theorem) to functions of several variables, the book treats the classical theorems of vector calculus, including those of Green, Gauss, and Stokes, in the language of differential forms on differentiable manifolds embedded in Euclidean space, and as corollaries of the generalized Stokes theorem on manifolds with boundaries. The book culminates with the statement and proof of this vast and abstract modern generalization of several classical results: (Note: The formalisms of differential forms and the exterior calculus used in Calculus on Manifolds were first formulated by Élie Cartan. Using this language, Cartan stated the generalized Stokes' theorem in its modern form, publishing the simple, elegant formula shown here in 1945. For a detailed discussion of how Stokes' theorem developed historically, see Katz (1979, pp. 146–156).)

Stokes' Theorem for Manifolds with Boundaries.—If $M$ is a compact oriented $k$-dimensional manifold-with-boundary, $\partial M$ is the boundary given the induced orientation, and $\omega$ is a ($k-1$)-form on $M$, then $\int_M d\omega =\int_{\partial M} \omega$.

The cover of Calculus on Manifolds features snippets of a July 2, 1850 letter from Lord Kelvin to Sir George Stokes containing the first disclosure of the classical Stokes' theorem.

== Reception ==
Calculus on Manifolds aims to present the topics of multivariable and vector calculus in the manner in which they are seen by a modern working mathematician, yet simply and selectively enough to be understood by undergraduate students whose previous coursework in mathematics comprises only single-variable calculus and introductory linear algebra. While Spivak's elementary treatment of modern mathematical tools is broadly successful—and this approach has made Calculus on Manifolds a standard introduction to the rigorous theory of multivariable calculus—the text is also well known for its laconic style, lack of motivating examples, and frequent omission of non-obvious steps and arguments. For example, in order to state and prove the generalized Stokes' theorem on chains, a profusion of unfamiliar concepts and constructions (e.g., tensor products, differential forms, tangent spaces, pullbacks, exterior derivatives, cube and chains) are introduced in quick succession within the span of 25 pages. Moreover, careful readers have noted a number of nontrivial oversights throughout the text, including missing hypotheses in theorems, inaccurately stated theorems, and proofs that fail to handle all cases.

== Other textbooks ==
A more recent textbook which also covers these topics at an undergraduate level is the text Analysis on Manifolds (1991) by James Munkres. At 366 pages or more than twice the length of Calculus on Manifolds, Munkres's work presents a more careful and detailed treatment of the subject matter at a leisurely pace. Nevertheless, Munkres acknowledges the influence of Spivak's earlier text in the preface of his text.

Spivak's five-volume textbook A Comprehensive Introduction to Differential Geometry states in its preface that Calculus on Manifolds serves as a prerequisite for a course based on this text. In fact, several of the concepts introduced in Calculus on Manifolds reappear in the first volume of this classic work in more sophisticated settings.

== See also ==
- Differential geometry
- Multilinear form
