= MathTime =

Typeface for TeX

MathTime (sometimes MathTıme) is a Times-style mathematical typeface for TeX, created by Michael Spivak. MathTime has been widely adopted by academic publishers such as by Elsevier, the American Physical Society, the Mathematical Association of America, and Springer. A distinguishable symbol in this font is the integral sign which appears in many mathematical, physical, and engineering journals. (Note: Compared to the integral sign associated with the default Computer Modern font for LaTeX, the MathTime integral sign "bulges" more prominently at the middle and makes mathematical texts typeset in MathTime readily identifiable.)

== Releases ==
=== MathTime 1.x & Plus ===
These versions were sold by (the now defunct) Y&Y.

Version 1.x contains math fonts (including italics) and symbols, while Plus added bold and "heavy" (extra bold) styles.

=== MathTime Professional 2 ===
Released by PCTeX, this is the current version of MathTime. It has a paid version known as Complete and a free version with limited features known as Lite.

Key features of MathTime Professional 2 include:

- Three optical sizes, for text (10 pt), super/subscripts (7pt), and second-order super/subscripts (5.5pt) respectively
- Italic "v" and "w" with rounded bottom
- Alternative italic "z" in the style of Times Linotype (as opposed to the default in the style of Times New Roman)
- Large mathematical operators

The following features are exclusive to the Complete version:

- Bold italics of Greek characters
- Bold and heavy styles of basic math symbols
- AMS symbols, including bold and heavy styles
- Script, blackboard bold, and "holey Roman" (seriffed blackboard bold) fonts

MathTime has its own license (i.e., unrelated to the license of Times New Roman).

== Related typefaces ==
- Belleek is a metrically identical (but significantly different in shape) free replacement font for MathTime 1.x. Belleek was released by TrueTeX (Richard Kinch) in 1998.
- TM Math by MicroPress is another commercial math font
- STIX fonts, XTIS, and TeX Gyre Termes are Times-style math fonts released for free and/or under open source licenses
