= Complex lamellar vector field =

In vector calculus, a complex lamellar vector field is a vector field which is orthogonal to a family of surfaces. In the broader context of differential geometry, complex lamellar vector fields are more often called hypersurface-orthogonal vector fields. They can be characterized in a number of different ways, many of which involve the curl. A lamellar vector field is a special case given by vector fields with zero curl.

The adjective "lamellar" derives from the noun "lamella", which means a thin layer. The lamellae to which "lamellar vector field" refers are the surfaces of constant potential, or in the complex case, the surfaces orthogonal to the vector field.

== Complex lamellar vector fields ==
In vector calculus, a complex lamellar vector field is a vector field in three dimensions which is orthogonal to its own curl. That is,

$$\mathbf{F}\cdot (\nabla\times \mathbf{F}) = 0.$$

The term lamellar vector field is sometimes used as a synonym for the special case of an irrotational vector field, meaning that
$$\nabla\times\mathbf{F}=\mathbf{0}.$$

Complex lamellar vector fields are precisely those that are normal to a family of surfaces. An irrotational vector field is locally the gradient of a function, and is therefore orthogonal to the family of level surfaces (the equipotential surfaces). Any vector field can be decomposed as the sum of an irrotational vector field and a complex lamellar field.

== Hypersurface-orthogonal vector fields ==
In greater generality, a vector field F on a pseudo-Riemannian manifold is said to be hypersurface-orthogonal if through an arbitrary point there is a smoothly embedded hypersurface which, at all of its points, is orthogonal to the vector field. By the Frobenius theorem this is equivalent to requiring that the Lie bracket of any smooth vector fields orthogonal to F is still orthogonal to F.

The condition of hypersurface-orthogonality can be rephrased in terms of the differential 1-form ω which is dual to F. The previously given Lie bracket condition can be reworked to require that the exterior derivative dω, when evaluated on any two tangent vectors which are orthogonal to F, is zero. This may also be phrased as the requirement that there is a smooth 1-form whose wedge product with ω equals dω.

Alternatively, this may be written as the condition that the differential 3-form ω ∧ dω is zero. This can also be phrased, in terms of the Levi-Civita connection defined by the metric, as requiring that the totally anti-symmetric part of the 3-tensor field ω_{i}∇_{j}ω_{k} is zero. Using a different formulation of the Frobenius theorem, it is also equivalent to require that ω is locally expressible as λ du for some functions λ and u.

In the special case of vector fields on three-dimensional Euclidean space, the hypersurface-orthogonal condition is equivalent to the complex lamellar condition, as seen by rewriting ω ∧ dω in terms of the Hodge star operator as ∗⟨ω, ∗dω⟩, with ∗dω being the 1-form dual to the curl vector field.

Hypersurface-orthogonal vector fields are particularly important in general relativity, where (among other reasons) the existence of a Killing vector field which is hypersurface-orthogonal is one of the requirements of a static spacetime. In this context, hypersurface-orthogonality is sometimes called irrotationality, although this is in conflict with the standard usage in three dimensions. Another name is rotation-freeness.

An even more general notion, in the language of Pfaffian systems, is that of a completely integrable 1-form ω, which amounts to the condition ω ∧ dω = 0 as given above. In this context, there is no metric and so there is no notion of "orthogonality".

== See also ==
- Beltrami vector field
- Conservative vector field
