= Michael Spivak =

American mathematician (1940–2020)

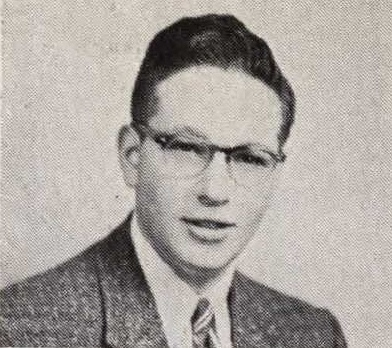
- Spivak in 1956
- Born: May 25, 1940; Queens, New York City, U.S.
- Died: October 1, 2020 (aged 80); Houston, Texas, U.S.
- Education: Harvard University (AB); Princeton University (MA, PhD)
- Known for: The Hitchhiker's Guide to Calculus; Calculus on Manifolds: A Modern Approach to Classical Theorems of Advanced Calculus; A Comprehensive Introduction to Differential Geometry; MathTime
- Awards: Leroy P. Steele Prize for Expository Writing (1985)
- Scientific career
- Fields: Mathematics; Differential geometry
- Thesis: On Spaces Satisfying Poincaré Duality (1964)
- Doctoral advisor: John Milnor

Michael David Spivak (May 25, 1940 – October 1, 2020) was an American mathematician specializing in differential geometry, an expositor of mathematics, and the founder of Publish-or-Perish Press. Spivak was the author of the five-volume A Comprehensive Introduction to Differential Geometry, which won the Leroy P. Steele Prize for expository writing in 1985.

== Biography ==
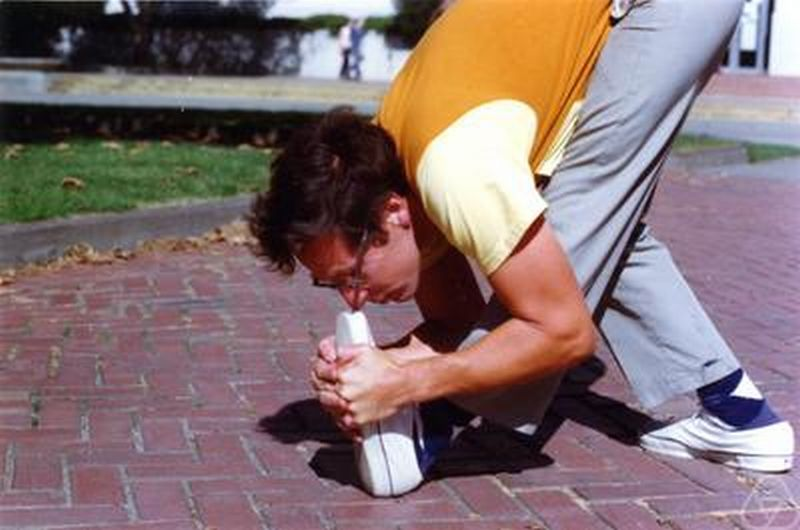
Spivak at UC Berkeley in 1974

Spivak was born in Queens, New York. He received his Bachelor of Arts (A.B.) from Harvard University in 1960, and in 1964 he received his Ph.D. from Princeton University under the supervision of John Milnor, with his thesis, On Spaces Satisfying Poincaré Duality. Afterwards, Spivak taught as a full-time Math Lecturer at Brandeis University, whilst writing Calculus on Manifolds: A Modern Approach to Classical Theorems of Advanced Calculus, which was later translated into Polish, Spanish, Japanese and Russian. In 1967, he won a year-long National Science Foundation fellowship to Princeton’s Institute for Advanced Study, after which Spivak returned to Brandeis as Assistant Professor of Mathematics until 1970. In his last year as Assistant Professor, he published the first two volumes of "what would become a five-volume masterpiece with the daunting title, Comprehensive Introduction to Differential Geometry." In 1985, Spivak received the Leroy P. Steele Prize for this five-volume set.

In 2004, Spivak lectured on elementary physics. Spivak's book, Physics for Mathematicians: Mechanics I (published December 6, 2010), contains the material that these lectures stemmed from and more. Spivak was also the designer of the MathTime Professional 2 fonts (which are widely used in academic publishing) and the creator of the TV series Science International.

Spivak was gay. He met his partner, Michael Kramer, in 1997.

Spivak died on October 1, 2020.

== Writing ==
His five-volume A Comprehensive Introduction to Differential Geometry is among his most influential and celebrated works. The distinctive pedagogical aim of the work, as stated in its preface, was to elucidate for graduate students the often obscure relationship between classical differential geometry—geometrically intuitive but imprecise—and its modern counterpart, replete with precise but unintuitive algebraic definitions. On several occasions, most prominently in Volume 2, Spivak "translates" the classical language that Gauss or Riemann would be familiar with to the abstract language that a modern differential geometer might use. The Leroy P. Steele Prize was awarded to Spivak in 1985 for his authorship of the work.

Spivak also authored several well-known undergraduate textbooks. Among them, his textbook Calculus takes a rigorous and theoretical approach to introductory calculus and includes proofs of many theorems taken on faith in most other introductory textbooks. Spivak acknowledged in the preface of the second edition that the work is arguably an introduction to mathematical analysis rather than a calculus textbook. Another of his well-known textbooks is Calculus on Manifolds, a concise (146 pages) but rigorous and modern treatment of multivariable calculus accessible to advanced undergraduates.

Spivak also wrote The Joy of TeX: A Gourmet Guide to Typesetting with the AMS-TeX Macro Package and The Hitchhiker's Guide to Calculus. The book Morse Theory by Spivak's PhD advisor John Milnor was based on lecture notes by Spivak and Robert Wells (as mentioned on the cover page of the booklet).

=== Spivak pronouns ===
Spivak employed the use of a set of English gender-neutral pronouns, e/em/eir, in his book The Joy of TeX, which are often referred to as Spivak pronouns. Spivak stated that he did not originate these pronouns.

== Bibliography ==
- Spivak, Michael (1967). "Spaces satisfying Poincaré duality". Topology. 6 (1): 77–101. doi:10.1016/0040-9383(67)90016-X. MR 0214071.
- Calculus on Manifolds: A Modern Approach to Classical Theorems of Advanced Calculus, (1965, revised 1968)
- Calculus, (1967, 4th ed. 2008)
- A Comprehensive Introduction to Differential Geometry, (1970, revised 3rd ed. 2005)
- The Joy of TeX: A Gourmet Guide to Typesetting with the AMS-TeX Macro package, (1990)
- A Hitchhiker's Guide to the Calculus, (1995)
- Spivak, Michael (2010). Physics for mathematicians—Mechanics I. Houston, TX: Publish or Perish. ISBN 978-0-914098-32-4. MR 2761185.

== See also ==
- Stable normal bundle
- Spivak pronoun
