= Exterior derivative =

Operation on differential forms

In mathematics, the exterior derivative extends the concept of the differential of a function to differential forms of higher degree. The exterior derivative was first described in its current form by Élie Cartan in 1899. The resulting calculus, known as exterior calculus, allows for a natural, metric-independent generalization of Stokes' theorem, Gauss's theorem, and Green's theorem from vector calculus.

If a differential $k$-form is thought of as measuring the flux through an infinitesimal $k$-parallelotope at each point of the manifold, then its exterior derivative can be thought of as measuring the net flux through the boundary of a $(k+1)$-parallelotope at each point.

== Definition ==
The exterior derivative of a differential form of degree $k$ (also differential $k$-form, or just $k$-form for brevity here) is a differential form of degree $k+1$.

If $f$ is a smooth function (a $0$-form), then the exterior derivative of $f$ is the differential of $f$. That is, $df$ is the unique 1-form such that for every smooth vector field $X$, $df(X)=d_Xf$, where $d_Xf$ is the directional derivative of $f$ in the direction of $X$.

The exterior product of differential forms (denoted with the same symbol $\wedge$) is defined as their pointwise exterior product.

There are a variety of equivalent definitions of the exterior derivative of a general $k$-form.

=== In terms of axioms ===
The exterior derivative $d$ is defined to be the unique $\mathbb{R}$-linear mapping from $k$-forms to $(k+1)$-forms that has the following properties:

- The operator $d$ applied to the $0$-form $f$ is the differential $df$ of $f$
- If $\alpha$ and $\beta$ are two $k$-forms, then $d(a\alpha+b\beta)=ad\alpha+bd\beta$ for any field elements $a,b$
- If $\alpha$ is a $k$-form and $\beta$ is an $\ell$-form, then $d(\alpha\wedge\beta)=d\alpha\wedge\beta+(-1)^k\alpha\wedge d\beta$ (graded product rule)
- If $\alpha$ is a $k$-form, then $d(d\alpha)=0$

If $f$ and $g$ are two $0$-forms (functions), then from the third property for the quantity $d(f\wedge g)$, which is simply $d(fg)$, the familiar product rule $d(fg)=g\,df+f\,dg$ is recovered. The third property can be generalised, for instance, if $\alpha$ is a $k$-form, $\beta$ is an $\ell$-form and $\gamma$ is an $m$-form, then

$$d(\alpha\wedge\beta\wedge\gamma)=d\alpha\wedge\beta\wedge\gamma+(-1)^k\alpha\wedge d\beta\wedge\gamma+(-1)^{k+\ell}\alpha\wedge\beta\wedge d\gamma.$$

=== In terms of local coordinates ===
Alternatively, one can work entirely in a local coordinate system $(x^1,\ldots,x^n)$. The coordinate differentials $\text{d}x^1,\ldots,\text{d}x^n$ form a basis of the space of one-forms, each associated with a coordinate. Given a multi-index $I=(i_1,\ldots,i_k)$ with $1\leq i_p\leq n$ for $1\leq p\leq k$ (and denoting $\text{d}x^{i_1}\wedge\cdots\wedge\text{d}x^{i_k}$ with $\text{d}x^I$), the exterior derivative of a (simple) $k$-form
$$\varphi = g\,dx^I = g\,dx^{i_1}\wedge dx^{i_2}\wedge\cdots\wedge dx^{i_k}$$
over $\mathbb{R}^n$ is defined as
$$d{\varphi} =  dg\wedge dx^{i_1}\wedge dx^{i_2}\wedge\cdots\wedge dx^{i_k} = \frac{\partial g}{\partial x^j} \, dx^j \wedge \,dx^{i_1}\wedge dx^{i_2}\wedge\cdots\wedge dx^{i_k}$$
(using the Einstein summation convention). The definition of the exterior derivative is extended linearly to a general $k$-form (which is expressible as a linear combination of basic simple $k$-forms)
$$\omega = f_I \, dx^I,$$
where each of the components of the multi-index $I$ run over all the values in $\{1,\ldots,n\}$. Note that whenever $j$ equals one of the components of the multi-index $I$ then $\text{d}x^j\wedge\text{d}x^I=0$ (see Exterior product).

The definition of the exterior derivative in local coordinates follows from the preceding definition in terms of axioms. Indeed, with the $k$-form $\varphi$ as defined above,
$$\begin{align}
d{\varphi} &= d\left (g\,dx^{i_1} \wedge \cdots \wedge dx^{i_k} \right ) \\
&= dg \wedge \left (dx^{i_1} \wedge \cdots \wedge dx^{i_k} \right ) +
g\,d\left (dx^{i_1}\wedge \cdots \wedge dx^{i_k} \right ) \\
&= dg \wedge dx^{i_1} \wedge \cdots \wedge dx^{i_k} + g \sum_{p=1}^k (-1)^{p-1} \, dx^{i_1}
\wedge \cdots \wedge dx^{i_{p-1}} \wedge d^2x^{i_p} \wedge dx^{i_{p+1}} \wedge \cdots \wedge dx^{i_k} \\
&= dg \wedge dx^{i_1} \wedge \cdots \wedge dx^{i_k} \\
&= \frac{\partial g}{\partial x^i} \, dx^i \wedge dx^{i_1} \wedge \cdots \wedge dx^{i_k}
\end{align}$$

Here, we have interpreted $g$ as a $0$-form, and then applied the properties of the exterior derivative.

This result extends directly to the general $k$-form $\omega$ as
$$d\omega = \frac{\partial f_I}{\partial x^i} \, dx^i \wedge dx^I .$$

In particular, for a $1$-form $\omega$, the components of $d\omega$ in local coordinates are
$$(d\omega)_{ij} = \partial_i \omega_j - \partial_j \omega_i.$$

Caution: There are two conventions regarding the meaning of $dx^{i_1} \wedge \cdots \wedge dx^{i_k}$. Most current authors have the convention that
$$\left(dx^{i_1} \wedge \cdots \wedge dx^{i_k}\right) \left( \frac{\partial}{\partial x^{i_1}}, \ldots, \frac{\partial}{\partial x^{i_k}} \right) = 1.$$
while in older texts like Kobayashi and Nomizu or Helgason
$$\left(dx^{i_1} \wedge \cdots \wedge dx^{i_k}\right) \left( \frac{\partial}{\partial x^{i_1}}, \ldots, \frac{\partial}{\partial x^{i_k}} \right) = \frac{1}{k!} .$$

=== In terms of invariant formula ===
Alternatively, there is an explicit formula for the exterior derivative of a $k$-form $\omega$, when paired with $k+1$ arbitrary smooth vector fields $V_0,V_1,\dots,V_k$:
$$d\omega(V_0, \ldots, V_k) = \sum_i(-1)^{i} V_i (\omega (V_0, \ldots, \widehat V_i, \ldots,V_k )) + \sum_{i<j}(-1)^{i+j}\omega ([V_i, V_j], V_0, \ldots, \widehat V_i, \ldots, \widehat V_j, \ldots, V_k )$$

where $[V_i,V_j]$ denotes the Lie bracket and a hat denotes the omission of that element:
$$\omega (V_0, \ldots, \widehat V_i, \ldots, V_k ) = \omega(V_0, \ldots, V_{i-1}, V_{i+1}, \ldots, V_k ).$$

In particular, when $\omega$ is a $1$-form, we have that $(d\omega)(X,Y)=\mathcal{L}_X(\omega(Y))-\mathcal{L}_Y(\omega(X))-\omega([X,Y])$.

Note: With the conventions of e.g., Kobayashi–Nomizu and Helgason the formula differs by a factor of $\frac{1}{k+1}$:
$$d\omega(V_0,\ldots,V_k)=\frac{1}{k+1}\left(\sum_i(-1)^iV_i(\omega(V_0,\ldots,\widehat{V}_i,\ldots,V_k))+\sum_{i<j}(-1)^{i+j}\omega([V_i, V_j],V_0,\ldots,\widehat{V}_i,\ldots,\widehat{V}_j,\ldots,V_k)\right).$$

== Examples ==
=== Example 1 ===
Consider $\sigma=u\ \text{d}x^1\wedge\text{d}x^2$ over a $1$-form basis $\text{d}x^1,\ldots,\text{d}x^n$ for a scalar field $u$. The exterior derivative is:
$$\begin{align}
d\sigma &= du \wedge dx^1 \wedge dx^2 \\
&= \left(\sum_{i=1}^n \frac{\partial u}{\partial x^i} \, dx^i\right) \wedge dx^1 \wedge dx^2 \\
&= \sum_{i=3}^n \left( \frac{\partial u}{\partial x^i} \, dx^i \wedge dx^1 \wedge dx^2 \right)
\end{align}$$

The last formula, where summation starts at $i=3$, follows easily from the properties of the exterior product. Namely, $\text{d}x^i\wedge\text{d}x^i=0$.

=== Example 2 ===
Let $\sigma=u\ \text{d}x+v\ \text{d}y$ be a $1$-form defined over $\mathbb{R}^2$. By applying the above formula to each term (consider $x^1=x$ and $x^2=y$) we have the sum
$$\begin{align}
d\sigma &= \left( \sum_{i=1}^2 \frac{\partial u}{\partial x^i} dx^i \wedge dx \right) + \left( \sum_{i=1}^2 \frac{\partial v}{\partial x^i} \, dx^i \wedge dy \right) \\
&= \left(\frac{\partial{u}}{\partial{x}} \, dx \wedge dx + \frac{\partial{u}}{\partial{y}} \, dy \wedge dx\right) + \left(\frac{\partial{v}}{\partial{x}} \, dx \wedge dy + \frac{\partial{v}}{\partial{y}} \, dy \wedge dy\right) \\
&= 0 - \frac{\partial{u}}{\partial{y}} \, dx \wedge dy + \frac{\partial{v}}{\partial{x}} \, dx \wedge dy + 0 \\
&= \left(\frac{\partial{v}}{\partial{x}} - \frac{\partial{u}}{\partial{y}}\right) \, dx \wedge dy
\end{align}$$

== Stokes' theorem on manifolds ==
If $M$ is a compact smooth orientable $n$-dimensional manifold with boundary, and $\omega$ is an $(n-1)$-form on $M$, then the generalized form of Stokes' theorem states that
$$\int_M d\omega = \int_{\partial{M}} \omega$$

Intuitively, if one thinks of $M$ as being divided into infinitesimal regions, and one adds the flux through the boundaries of all the regions, the interior boundaries all cancel out, leaving the total flux through the boundary of $M$.

== Further properties ==
=== Closed and exact forms ===
A $k$-form $\omega$ is called closed if $d\omega=0$; closed forms are the kernel of $d$. $\omega$ is called exact if $\omega=d\alpha$ for some $(k-1)$-form $\alpha$; exact forms are the image of $d$. Because $d^2=0$, every exact form is closed. The Poincaré lemma states that in a contractible region, the converse is true.

=== de Rham cohomology ===
Because the exterior derivative $d$ has the property that $d^2=0$, it can be used as the differential (coboundary) to define de Rham cohomology on a manifold. The $k$-th de Rham cohomology (group) is the vector space of closed $k$-forms modulo the exact $k$-forms; as noted in the previous section, the Poincaré lemma states that these vector spaces are trivial for a contractible region, for $k>0$. For smooth manifolds, integration of forms gives a natural homomorphism from the de Rham cohomology to the singular cohomology over $\mathbb{R}$. The theorem of de Rham shows that this map is actually an isomorphism, a far-reaching generalization of the Poincaré lemma. As suggested by the generalized Stokes' theorem, the exterior derivative is the "dual" of the boundary map on singular simplices.

=== Naturality ===
The exterior derivative is natural in the technical sense: if $f : M \to N$ is a smooth map and $\Omega^k$ is the contravariant smooth functor that assigns to each manifold the space of $k$-forms on the manifold, then the following diagram commutes

so $d(f^*\omega)=f^*d\omega$, where $f^*$ denotes the pullback of $f$. This follows from that $f^*\omega(\cdot)$, by definition, is $\omega(f_*(\cdot))$, $f_*$ being the pushforward of $f$. Thus $d$ is a natural transformation from $\Omega^k$ to $\Omega^{k+1}$.

== Exterior derivative in vector calculus ==
Most vector calculus operators are special cases of, or have close relationships to, the notion of exterior differentiation.

=== Gradient ===
A smooth function $f : M \to \R$ on a real differentiable manifold $M$ is a $0$-form. The exterior derivative of this $0$-form is the $1$-form $df$.

When an inner product $\langle\cdot,\cdot\rangle$ is defined, the gradient $\nabla f$ of a function $f$ is defined as the unique vector in $V$ such that its inner product with any element of $V$ is the directional derivative of $f$ along the vector, that is such that
$$\langle \nabla f, \cdot \rangle = df = \sum_{i=1}^n \frac{\partial f}{\partial x^i}\, dx^i .$$

That is,
$$\nabla f = (df)^\sharp = \sum_{i=1}^n \frac{\partial f}{\partial x^i}\, \left(dx^i\right)^\sharp ,$$
where $\sharp$ denotes the musical isomorphism $\sharp : V^* \to V$ mentioned earlier that is induced by the inner product.

The $1$-form $df$ is a section of the cotangent bundle, that gives a local linear approximation to $f$ in the cotangent space at each point.

=== Divergence ===
A vector field $V=(v_1,v_2,\ldots,v_n)$ on $\mathbb{R}^n$ has a corresponding $(n-1)$-form
$$\begin{align}
\omega_V &= v_1 \left (dx^2 \wedge \cdots \wedge dx^n \right) - v_2 \left (dx^1 \wedge dx^3 \wedge \cdots \wedge dx^n \right ) + \cdots + (-1)^{n-1}v_n \left (dx^1 \wedge \cdots \wedge dx^{n-1} \right) \\
&= \sum_{i=1}^n (-1)^{(i-1)}v_i \left (dx^1 \wedge \cdots \wedge dx^{i-1} \wedge \widehat{dx^{i}} \wedge dx^{i+1} \wedge \cdots \wedge dx^n \right )
\end{align}$$
where $\widehat{dx^{i}}$ denotes the omission of that element.

(For instance, when $n=3$, i.e. in three-dimensional space, the $2$-form $\omega_V$ is locally the scalar triple product with $V$.) The integral of $\omega_V$ over a hypersurface is the flux of $V$ over that hypersurface.

The exterior derivative of this $(n-1)$-form is the $n$-form
$$d\omega _V = \operatorname{div} V \left (dx^1 \wedge dx^2 \wedge \cdots \wedge dx^n \right ).$$

=== Curl ===
A vector field $V$ on $\mathbb{R}^n$ also has a corresponding $1$-form
$$\eta_V = v_1 \, dx^1 + v_2 \, dx^2 + \cdots + v_n \, dx^n.$$

Locally, $\eta_V$ is the dot product with $V$. The integral of $\eta_V$ along a path is the work done against $-V$ along that path.

When $n=3$, in three-dimensional space, the exterior derivative of the $1$-form $\eta_V$ is the $2$-form
$$d\eta_V = \omega_{\operatorname{curl} V}.$$

=== Invariant formulations of operators in vector calculus ===
The standard vector calculus operators can be generalized for any pseudo-Riemannian manifold, and written in coordinate-free notation as follows:
$$\begin{array}{rcccl}
\operatorname{grad} f &\equiv& \nabla f        &=& \left( d f \right)^\sharp \\
\operatorname{div} F  &\equiv& \nabla \cdot F  &=& {\star d {\star} \mathord{\left( F^\flat \right)}} \\
\operatorname{curl} F &\equiv& \nabla \times F &=& \left( {\star} d \mathord{\left( F^\flat \right)} \right)^\sharp \\
\Delta f              &\equiv& \nabla^2 f      &=& {\star} d {\star} d f \\
&      & \nabla^2 F      &=& \left(d{\star}d{\star}\mathord{\left(F^{\flat}\right)} - {\star}d{\star}d\mathord{\left(F^{\flat}\right)}\right)^{\sharp}, \\
\end{array}$$
where $\star$ is the Hodge star operator, $\flat$ and $\sharp$ are the musical isomorphisms, $f$ is a scalar field and $F$ is a vector field.

Note that the expression for $\operatorname{curl}$ requires $\sharp$ to act on $\star d(F^{\flat})$, which is a form of degree $n-2$. A natural generalization of $\sharp$ to $k$-forms of arbitrary degree allows this expression to make sense for any $n$.

== See also ==
- Exterior covariant derivative
- de Rham complex
- Finite element exterior calculus
- Discrete exterior calculus
- Green's theorem
- Lie derivative
- Stokes' theorem
- Fractal derivative

== Notes ==
- Cartan, Élie (1899). "Sur certaines expressions différentielles et le problème de Pfaff". Annales Scientifiques de l'École Normale Supérieure. 3 (in French). 16: 239–332. doi:10.24033/asens.467. JFM 30.0313.04.
- Conlon, Lawrence (2001) [1993]. Differentiable Manifolds (2nd ed.). Boston: Birkhäuser. p. 239. ISBN 978-0-8176-4134-4.
- Darling, R. W. R. (1994). Differential Forms and Connections. Cambridge University Press. p. 35. ISBN 978-0-521-46259-4.
- Flanders, Harley (1963). Differential Forms with Applications to the Physical Sciences. Mathematics in Science and Engineering. Vol. 11. New York: Academic Press. Zbl 112.32003.
- Loomis, Lynn H.; Sternberg, Shlomo (1990) [1968]. Advanced Calculus (revised ed.). Boston: Jones and Bartlett. ISBN 0-86720-122-3.
- Ramanan, S. (2005). Global Calculus. Graduate Studies in Mathematics. Vol. 65. Providence, RI: American Mathematical Society. p. 54. ISBN 0-8218-3702-8.
- Spivak, Michael (1965). Calculus on Manifolds. Mathematics Monograph Series. New York: W. A. Benjamin. Zbl 141.05403.
- Spivak, Michael (1999) [1970]. A Comprehensive Introduction to Differential Geometry. Vol. 1 (3rd ed.). Houston: Publish or Perish. ISBN 978-0-914098-70-6.
- Warner, Frank W. (1983). Foundations of Differentiable Manifolds and Lie Groups. Graduate Texts in Mathematics. Vol. 94. New York: Springer. ISBN 978-0-387-90894-6.
