= Stokes' theorem =

Theorem in vector calculus

An illustration of Stokes' theorem. The surface Σ has boundary ∂Σ and normal vector n. The positive direction around the boundary and the positive normal direction are related by the right-hand rule.

Stokes' theorem, also known as the Kelvin–Stokes theorem, is a theorem in vector calculus that relates the behavior of a vector field along the edge of a surface to the behavior of its curl on the surface itself. In its usual three-dimensional form, it says that the total circulation of a vector field around a closed curve is equal to the total curl of the field through a surface bounded by that curve.

If Σ is an oriented surface with boundary ∂Σ, Stokes' theorem is commonly written as

$$\oint_{\partial\Sigma} \mathbf F\cdot d\mathbf r = \iint_{\Sigma} (\nabla\times \mathbf F)\cdot \mathbf n\,dS.$$

Here the left side is the line integral of the vector field around the boundary curve, while the right side is the surface integral of its curl over the surface. Informally, the theorem says that adding up the local rotation of a vector field across a surface gives the net circulation around its edge.

The theorem is also called the fundamental theorem for curls, the curl theorem, or the rotor theorem. It is a special case of the generalized Stokes theorem. In the language of differential forms, the vector field corresponds to a 1-form and its curl corresponds to the exterior derivative of that form.

== A first intuitive concept proof ==
Let $\vec{F}$ be an $R^3$ vector field and $\gamma$ be a simple closed curve $\in R^3$. We define the circulation as
$$\oint_{\gamma} \vec{F} \cdot d\vec{\ell}$$
$d\vec{\ell}$ being the tangent vector to the curve (whose direction is determined by our choosing of directionality of the curve itself).

If we connect two random points of $\gamma$ and compute the sum of the circulations of a vector field along the two sub-curves, it's clear that the term associated to the newly constructed branch vanishes as the directions of the $d\vec{\ell}$ vectors for the points of this segment are opposite in the two circulations. From here we can extend the reasoning to multiple arbitrarily added connecting segments obtaining the following:
$$\oint_{\gamma}\vec{F}\cdot d\vec{\ell} = \sum_i \oint_{C_i}\vec{F}\cdot d\vec{\ell}_i$$
With $C_i$ the sub curves created by the process of connecting two points at a time and $S_i$ the surface enclosed by $C_i$.

By iteration of this subdivision process we obtain smaller and smaller curves. Let's take the limit
$$\lim _{S_i \to 0} \frac{1}{S_i}\oint_{C_i}\vec{F}\cdot d\vec{\ell}_i$$
We can represent an arbitrarily small surface with a square. Let's take for example an infinitesimal square with the vector normal to the surface pointing along the Z direction: We can consider the field constant along the sides and take its value on their middle points, multiply this by the oriented length of the sides to have the circulation of this infinitesimal curve. Furthermore we can use a Taylor's expansion to relate all four field values to the same vertex of the infinitesimal square. Having $(x,y)$ a reference vertex of the square and $\Delta x$ and $\Delta y$ the lengths of the (infinitesimal) sides, the result is:
$$\begin{align}
\oint_{C_i}\vec{F}\cdot d\vec{\ell}_i = \left(F_x(x,y)+\frac{\Delta x}{2}\frac{\partial F_x}{\partial x}\right) \Delta x\\
+\left(F_y(x,y) +\Delta x \frac{\partial F_y}{\partial x}+\frac{\Delta y}{2} \frac{\partial F_y}{\partial y}\right) \Delta y\\
-\left(F_x(x,y) +\frac{\Delta x }{2} \frac{\partial F_x}{\partial x}+\Delta y \frac{\partial F_x}{\partial y}\right) \Delta x\\
-\left(F_y(x,y)+\frac{\Delta y}{2} \frac{\partial F_y}{\partial y}\right)\Delta y
\end{align}$$
As per construction, Z component goes to zero with the scalar product, and can be ignored. Simplifying the expression we find:
$$\begin{align}
\oint _{C_i} \vec{F} \cdot d\vec{\ell}_i = \Delta x \Delta y\left(\frac{\partial F_y}{\partial x}-\frac{\partial F_x}{\partial y}\right)\\\Delta x \Delta y = S_i\\
\to \frac{1}{S_i}\oint_{C_i}\vec{F}\cdot d\vec{\ell}_i=(\vec{\nabla}\times \vec{F})_z
\end{align}$$
In general we find the following to be true for any orientation:
$$\lim _{S_i \to 0} \left(\frac{1}S_i{}\oint_{C_i} \vec{F}\cdot d\vec{\ell}\right) = \vec{n}\cdot (\vec{\nabla} \times \vec{F})$$
with $\vec{n}$ the normal vector to the surface.

Using the previous relations we can write:

$\oint _C \vec{F} \cdot d\vec{\ell} = \sum_{i=1}^N \left(\frac{1}{S_i}\oint_{C_i}\vec{F}\cdot d\vec{\ell}_i\right)S_i$

And finally, taking the limit for $S_i \to 0$ and $N \to \infty$ with $S_i\vec{n}_i := d\vec{a}$ we get

$$\oint_C \vec{F} \cdot d\vec{\ell} =\iint_S (\vec{\nabla}\times \vec{F})\cdot d\vec{a}$$

Or Stokes' Theorem.

== Theorem ==
Let $\Sigma$ be a smooth oriented surface in $\R^3$, parametrized by $\mathbf\Sigma(u,v)$, with boundary $\partial \Sigma \equiv \Gamma$, parametrized by $\mathbf\Gamma(t)$. If a vector field
$$\mathbf{F}(x,y,z) = (F_x(x, y, z), F_y(x, y, z), F_z(x, y, z))$$
has continuous first-order partial derivatives in $\Sigma$, then
$$\iint_\Sigma (\nabla \times \mathbf{F}) \cdot d\mathbf{\Sigma}  =  \oint_{\partial\Sigma} \mathbf{F} \cdot
d\mathbf{\Gamma}$$
with the shorthands for the line element $d\mathbf\Gamma = \frac{d\mathbf\Gamma}{dt}dt$ and the surface element
$$d\mathbf{\Sigma} = \mathbf{n} d\Sigma = \left( \frac{\partial \mathbf\Sigma}{\partial u} \times \frac{\partial \mathbf\Sigma}{\partial v} \right) du dv$$
where $\mathbf{n}(u,v)$ is the vector orthogonal to the surface at the point $\mathbf\Sigma(u,v)$.

The equality can be expressed in terms of differential forms, with $\wedge$ being the wedge product and $\text{d}$ the exterior derivative:
$$\begin{align}
&\iint_\Sigma \left(\left(\frac{\partial F_z}{\partial y}-\frac{\partial F_y}{\partial z} \right)\,\mathrm{d}y\wedge \mathrm{d}z +\left(\frac{\partial F_x}{\partial z}-\frac{\partial F_z}{\partial x}\right)\, \mathrm{d}z\wedge \mathrm{d}x  +\left (\frac{\partial F_y}{\partial x}-\frac{\partial F_x}{\partial y}\right)\, \mathrm{d}x\wedge \mathrm{d}y\right) \\
& = \oint_{\partial\Sigma} \Bigl(F_x\, \mathrm{d}x+F_y\, \mathrm{d}y+F_z\, \mathrm{d}z\Bigr).
\end{align}$$

The main challenge in a precise statement of Stokes' theorem is in defining the notion of a boundary. Surfaces such as the Koch snowflake, for example, are well-known not to exhibit a Riemann-integrable boundary, and the notion of surface measure in Lebesgue theory cannot be defined for a non-Lipschitz surface. One (advanced) technique is to pass to a weak formulation and then apply the machinery of geometric measure theory; for that approach see the coarea formula. In this article, we instead use a more elementary definition, based on the fact that a boundary can be discerned for full-dimensional subsets of $\R^2$.

A more detailed statement will be given for subsequent discussions. Let $\gamma:[a,b]\to\R^2$ be a piecewise smooth Jordan plane curve: a simple closed curve in the plane. The Jordan curve theorem implies that $\gamma$ divides $\R^2$ into two components, a compact one and another that is non-compact. Let $D$ denote the compact part; then $D$ is bounded by $\gamma$. It now suffices to transfer this notion of boundary along a continuous map to our surface in $\R^3$. But we already have such a map: the parametrization of $\Sigma$.

Suppose $\psi:D\to\R^3$ is piecewise smooth at the neighborhood of $D$ (Note: From the definition of $D$, $D$ is obviously a bounded closed set in $\R^2$. "A neighborhood of D" means "an open set in $\R^2$ that contains D.") , with $\Sigma=\psi(D)$. (Note: $\Sigma=\psi(D)$ represents the image set of $D$ by $\psi$) If $\Gamma$ is the space curve defined by $\Gamma(t)=\psi(\gamma(t))$ (Note: $\Gamma$ may not be a Jordan curve if the loop $\gamma$ interacts poorly with $\psi$. Nonetheless, $\Gamma$ is always a loop or loops, and topologically a connected sum of countably many Jordan curves, so that the integrals are well-defined.) then we call $\Gamma$ the boundary of $\Sigma$, written $\partial\Sigma$ (Note: Even if we consider two-dimensional polar coordinates, then if we let ∂Σ = Γ, then ∂Σ can clearly contain a topological interior point of Σ. However, in orientable combinatorial manifolds, this is not such a serious problem, since the line integrals over the interior points cancel out: in an orientable manifold, the line integral over ∂Σ coincides with the line integral over the true boundary.An even more important example is that this theorem also applies to manifolds without a topological boundary, such as the sphere or the torus. In such cases, if ∂Σ = Γ, then ∂Σ is completely contained within Σ. However, in such cases, the resulting line integrals over Γ completely cancel each other out. This allows us to assert that the surface integral of the curl of a vector field on a manifold without a boundary is zero.)

With the above notation, if $\mathbf{F}$ is any smooth vector field on $\R^3$, then
$$\oint_{\partial\Sigma} \mathbf{F}\, \cdot\, d{\mathbf{\Gamma}}  = \iint_{\Sigma} \nabla\times\mathbf{F}\, \cdot\, d\mathbf{\Sigma}.$$

Here, the "$\cdot$" represents the dot product in $\R^3$.

=== Special case of a more general theorem ===
Stokes' theorem can be viewed as a special case of the following identity:
$$\oint_{\partial\Sigma} (\mathbf{F}\, \cdot\, d{\mathbf{\Gamma}})\,\mathbf{g}  = \iint_{\Sigma}\left[ d\mathbf{\Sigma}\cdot\left( \nabla\times\mathbf{F}- \mathbf{F}\times\nabla\right)\right]\mathbf{g},$$
where $\mathbf{g}$ is any smooth vector or scalar field in $\mathbb{R}^3$. When $\mathbf{g}$ is a uniform scalar field, the standard Stokes' theorem is recovered.

== Proof ==
The proof of the theorem consists of 4 steps. We assume Green's theorem, so what is of concern is how to boil down the three-dimensional complicated problem (Stokes' theorem) to a two-dimensional rudimentary problem (Green's theorem). When proving this theorem, mathematicians normally deduce it as a special case of a more general result, which is stated in terms of differential forms, and proved using more sophisticated machinery. While powerful, these techniques require substantial background, so the proof below avoids them, and does not presuppose any knowledge beyond a familiarity with basic vector calculus and linear algebra. At the end of this section, a short alternative proof of Stokes' theorem is given, as a corollary of the generalized Stokes' theorem.

=== Elementary proof ===
==== First step of the elementary proof (parametrization of integral) ====
As in § Theorem, we reduce the dimension by using the natural parametrization of the surface. Let ψ and γ be as in that section, and note that by change of variables
$$\oint_{\partial\Sigma}{\mathbf{F}(\mathbf{x})\cdot\,\mathrm{d}\mathbf{\Gamma}}
= \oint_{\gamma}{\mathbf{F}(\boldsymbol{\psi}(\mathbf{\gamma}))\cdot\,\mathrm{d}\boldsymbol{\psi}(\mathbf{\gamma})}
= \oint_{\gamma}{\mathbf{F}(\boldsymbol{\psi}(\mathbf{y}))\cdot J_{\mathbf{y}}(\boldsymbol{\psi})\,\mathrm{d}\gamma}$$
where J_{y}ψ stands for the Jacobian matrix of ψ at y = γ(t).

Now let {e_{u}, e_{v}} be an orthonormal basis in the coordinate directions of R^{2}. (Note: In this article, $$\mathbf{e}_u= (1, 0), \ \mathbf{e}_v = (0, 1).$$ Note that, in some textbooks on vector analysis, these are assigned to different things. For example, in some text book's notation, {e_{u}, e_{v}} can mean the following {t_{u}, t_{v}} respectively. In this article, however, these are two completely different things. $$\mathbf{t}_{u} =\frac {1}{h_u}\frac {\partial \varphi}{\partial u} \, , \mathbf{t}_{v} =\frac {1}{h_v}\frac {\partial \varphi}{\partial v}.$$ Here, $$h_u = \left\|\frac {\partial \varphi}{\partial u}\right\| , h_v = \left\|\frac {\partial \varphi}{\partial v} \right\|,$$ and the "$\| \cdot \|$" represents Euclidean norm.)

Recognizing that the columns of J_{y}ψ are precisely the partial derivatives of ψ at y, we can expand the previous equation in coordinates as
$$\begin{align}
\oint_{\partial\Sigma}{\mathbf{F}(\mathbf{x})\cdot\,\mathrm{d}\mathbf{\Gamma}}
&= \oint_{\gamma}{\mathbf{F}(\boldsymbol{\psi}(\mathbf{y}))\cdot J_{\mathbf{y}}(\boldsymbol{\psi})\mathbf{e}_u(\mathbf{e}_u\cdot\,\mathrm{d}\mathbf{y}) + \mathbf{F}(\boldsymbol{\psi}(\mathbf{y}))\cdot J_{\mathbf{y}}(\boldsymbol{\psi})\mathbf{e}_v(\mathbf{e}_v\cdot\,\mathrm{d}\mathbf{y})} \\
&=\oint_{\gamma}{\left(\left(\mathbf{F}(\boldsymbol{\psi}(\mathbf{y}))\cdot\frac{\partial\boldsymbol{\psi}}{\partial u}(\mathbf{y})\right)\mathbf{e}_u + \left(\mathbf{F}(\boldsymbol{\psi}(\mathbf{y}))\cdot\frac{\partial\boldsymbol{\psi}}{\partial v}(\mathbf{y})\right)\mathbf{e}_v\right)\cdot\,\mathrm{d}\mathbf{y}}
\end{align}$$

==== Second step in the elementary proof (defining the pullback) ====
The previous step suggests we define the function
$$\mathbf{P}(u,v) = \left(\mathbf{F}(\boldsymbol{\psi}(u,v))\cdot\frac{\partial\boldsymbol{\psi}}{\partial u}(u,v)\right)\mathbf{e}_u + \left(\mathbf{F}(\boldsymbol{\psi}(u,v))\cdot\frac{\partial\boldsymbol{\psi}}{\partial v}(u,v) \right)\mathbf{e}_v$$

Now, if the scalar value functions $P_u$ and $P_v$ are defined as follows,
$${P_u}(u,v) = \left(\mathbf{F}(\boldsymbol{\psi}(u,v))\cdot\frac{\partial\boldsymbol{\psi}}{\partial u}(u,v)\right)$$
$${P_v}(u,v) =\left(\mathbf{F}(\boldsymbol{\psi}(u,v))\cdot\frac{\partial\boldsymbol{\psi}}{\partial v}(u,v) \right)$$
then,
$$\mathbf{P}(u,v) = {P_u}(u,v) \mathbf{e}_u + {P_v}(u,v)  \mathbf{e}_v .$$

This is the pullback of F along ψ, and, by the above, it satisfies
$$\oint_{\partial\Sigma}{\mathbf{F}(\mathbf{x})\cdot\,\mathrm{d}\mathbf{l}}=\oint_{\gamma}{\mathbf{P}(\mathbf{y})\cdot\,\mathrm{d}\mathbf{l}}
=\oint_{\gamma}{( {P_u}(u,v) \mathbf{e}_u + {P_v}(u,v)  \mathbf{e}_v)\cdot\,\mathrm{d}\mathbf{l}}$$

We have successfully reduced one side of Stokes' theorem to a 2-dimensional formula; we now turn to the other side.

==== Third step of the elementary proof (second equation) ====
First, calculate the partial derivatives appearing in Green's theorem, via the product rule:
$$\begin{align}
\frac{\partial P_u}{\partial v} &= \frac{\partial (\mathbf{F}\circ \boldsymbol{\psi})}{\partial v}\cdot\frac{\partial \boldsymbol\psi}{\partial u} + (\mathbf{F}\circ \boldsymbol\psi) \cdot\frac{\partial^2 \boldsymbol\psi}{\partial v \, \partial u} \\[5pt]
\frac{\partial P_v}{\partial u} &= \frac{\partial (\mathbf{F}\circ \boldsymbol{\psi})}{\partial u}\cdot\frac{\partial \boldsymbol\psi}{\partial v} + (\mathbf{F}\circ \boldsymbol\psi) \cdot\frac{\partial^2 \boldsymbol\psi}{\partial u \, \partial v}
\end{align}$$

Conveniently, the second term vanishes in the difference, by equality of mixed partials. So, (Note: For all $\textbf{a}, \textbf{b} \in \mathbb{R}^{n}$, for all $A ; n\times n$ square matrix, $\textbf{a}\cdot A \textbf{b} = \textbf{a}^\mathsf{T}A \textbf{b}$ and therefore $\textbf{a}\cdot A \textbf{b} = \textbf{b} \cdot A^\mathsf{T} \textbf{a}$.)
$$\begin{align}
\frac{\partial P_v}{\partial u} - \frac{\partial P_u}{\partial v}
&= \frac{\partial (\mathbf{F}\circ \boldsymbol\psi)}{\partial u}\cdot\frac{\partial \boldsymbol\psi}{\partial v} - \frac{\partial (\mathbf{F}\circ \boldsymbol\psi)}{\partial v}\cdot\frac{\partial \boldsymbol\psi}{\partial u} \\[5pt]
&= \frac{\partial \boldsymbol\psi}{\partial v}\cdot(J_{\boldsymbol\psi(u,v)}\mathbf{F})\frac{\partial \boldsymbol\psi}{\partial u} - \frac{\partial \boldsymbol\psi}{\partial u}\cdot(J_{\boldsymbol\psi(u,v)}\mathbf{F})\frac{\partial \boldsymbol\psi}{\partial v} && \text{(chain rule)}\\[5pt]
&= \frac{\partial \boldsymbol\psi}{\partial v}\cdot\left(J_{\boldsymbol\psi(u,v)}\mathbf{F}-{(J_{\boldsymbol\psi(u,v)}\mathbf{F})}^{\mathsf{T}}\right)\frac{\partial \boldsymbol\psi}{\partial u}
\end{align}$$

But now consider the matrix in that quadratic form—that is, $J_{\boldsymbol\psi(u,v)}\mathbf{F}-(J_{\boldsymbol\psi(u,v)}\mathbf{F})^{\mathsf{T}}$. We claim this matrix in fact describes a cross product. Here the superscript "${}^{\mathsf{T}}$" represents the transposition of matrices.

To be precise, let $A=(A_{ij})_{ij}$ be an arbitrary 3 × 3 matrix and let
$$\mathbf{a}= \begin{bmatrix}a_1 \\ a_2 \\ a_3\end{bmatrix} = \begin{bmatrix}A_{32}-A_{23} \\ A_{13}-A_{31} \\ A_{21}-A_{12}\end{bmatrix}$$

Note that x ↦ a × x is linear, so it is determined by its action on basis elements. But by direct calculation
$$\begin{align}
\left(A-A^{\mathsf{T}}\right)\mathbf{e}_1 &= \begin{bmatrix} 0 \\ a_3 \\ -a_2 \end{bmatrix} = \mathbf{a}\times\mathbf{e}_1\\
\left(A-A^{\mathsf{T}}\right)\mathbf{e}_2 &= \begin{bmatrix} -a_3 \\ 0 \\ a_1 \end{bmatrix} = \mathbf{a}\times\mathbf{e}_2\\
\left(A-A^{\mathsf{T}}\right)\mathbf{e}_3 &= \begin{bmatrix} a_2 \\ -a_1 \\ 0 \end{bmatrix} = \mathbf{a}\times\mathbf{e}_3
\end{align}$$
Here, {e_{1}, e_{2}, e_{3}} represents an orthonormal basis in the coordinate directions of $\R^3$. (Note: In this article, $$\mathbf{e}_1= (1, 0, 0), \ \mathbf{e}_2 = (0, 1, 0), \ \mathbf{e}_3 = (0, 0, 1).$$ Note that, in some textbooks on vector analysis, these are assigned to different things.)

Thus (A − A^{T})x = a × x for any x.

Substituting ${(J_{\boldsymbol\psi(u,v)}\mathbf{F})}$ for A, we obtain
$$\left({(J_{\boldsymbol\psi(u,v)}\mathbf{F})} - {(J_{\boldsymbol\psi(u,v)}\mathbf{F})}^{\mathsf{T}} \right) \mathbf{x} =(\nabla\times\mathbf{F})\times \mathbf{x}, \quad \text{for all}\, \mathbf{x}\in\R^{3}$$

We can now recognize the difference of partials as a (scalar) triple product:
$$\begin{align}
\frac{\partial P_v}{\partial u} - \frac{\partial P_u}{\partial v}
&= \frac{\partial \boldsymbol\psi}{\partial v}\cdot(\nabla\times\mathbf{F}) \times \frac{\partial \boldsymbol\psi}{\partial u} = (\nabla\times\mathbf{F})\cdot \frac{\partial \boldsymbol\psi}{\partial u} \times \frac{\partial \boldsymbol\psi}{\partial v}
\end{align}$$

On the other hand, the definition of a surface integral also includes a triple product—the very same one!
$$\begin{align}
\iint_\Sigma (\nabla\times\mathbf{F})\cdot \, d\mathbf{\Sigma}
&=\iint_D {(\nabla\times\mathbf{F})(\boldsymbol\psi(u,v))\cdot\frac{\partial \boldsymbol\psi}{\partial u}(u,v)\times \frac{\partial \boldsymbol\psi}{\partial v}(u,v)\,\mathrm{d}u\,\mathrm{d}v}
\end{align}$$

So, we obtain
$$\iint_\Sigma (\nabla\times\mathbf{F})\cdot \,\mathrm{d}\mathbf{\Sigma } = \iint_D \left( \frac{\partial P_v}{\partial u} - \frac{\partial P_u}{\partial v} \right) \,\mathrm{d}u\,\mathrm{d}v$$

==== Fourth step of the elementary proof (reduction to Green's theorem) ====
Combining the second and third steps and then applying Green's theorem completes the proof. Green's theorem asserts the following: for any region D bounded by the Jordans closed curve γ and two scalar-valued smooth functions $P_u(u,v), P_v(u,v)$ defined on D;

$$\oint_{\gamma}{( {P_u}(u,v) \mathbf{e}_u + {P_v}(u,v)  \mathbf{e}_v)\cdot\,\mathrm{d}\mathbf{l}}
= \iint_D \left( \frac{\partial P_v}{\partial u} - \frac{\partial P_u}{\partial v} \right) \,\mathrm{d}u\,\mathrm{d}v$$

We can substitute the conclusion of STEP2 into the left-hand side of Green's theorem above, and substitute the conclusion of STEP3 into the right-hand side. Q.E.D.

=== Proof via differential forms ===
The functions $\R^3\to\R^3$ can be identified with the differential 1-forms on $\R^3$ via the map
$$F_x\mathbf{e}_1+F_y\mathbf{e}_2+F_z\mathbf{e}_3 \mapsto F_x\,\mathrm{d}x + F_y\,\mathrm{d}y + F_z\,\mathrm{d}z .$$

Write the differential 1-form associated to a function F as ω_{F}. Then one can calculate that
$$\star\omega_{\nabla\times\mathbf{F}}=\mathrm{d}\omega_{\mathbf{F}},$$
where ★ is the Hodge star and $\mathrm{d}$ is the exterior derivative. Thus, by generalized Stokes' theorem,
$$\oint_{\partial\Sigma}{\mathbf{F}\cdot\,\mathrm{d}\mathbf{\gamma}}
=\oint_{\partial\Sigma}{\omega_{\mathbf{F}}}
=\int_{\Sigma}{\mathrm{d}\omega_{\mathbf{F}}}
=\int_{\Sigma}{\star\omega_{\nabla\times\mathbf{F}}}
=\iint_{\Sigma}{\nabla\times\mathbf{F}\cdot\,\mathrm{d}\mathbf{\Sigma}}$$

== History ==
The theorem first appears in a letter from William Thomson to George Stokes dated 2 July 1850. Stokes set it as question 8 on the 1854 Smith's Prize examination at Cambridge, which led to the result bearing his name.

== Applications ==
=== Irrotational fields ===
In this section, we will discuss the irrotational field (lamellar vector field) based on Stokes' theorem.

Definition 2-1 (irrotational field). A smooth vector field F on an open set $U\subseteq\R^3$ is irrotational (lamellar vector field) if ∇ × F = 0.

This concept is very fundamental in mechanics; as we'll prove later, if F is irrotational and the domain of F is simply connected, then F is a conservative vector field.

==== Helmholtz's theorem ====
In this section, we will introduce a theorem that is derived from Stokes' theorem and characterizes vortex-free vector fields. In classical mechanics and fluid dynamics it is called Helmholtz's theorem.

Theorem 2-1 (Helmholtz's theorem in fluid dynamics). Let $U\subseteq\R^3$ be an open subset with a lamellar vector field F and let c_{0}, c_{1}: [0, 1] → U be piecewise smooth loops. If there is a function H: [0, 1] × [0, 1] → U such that

- [TLH0] H is piecewise smooth,
- [TLH1] H(t, 0) = c_{0}(t) for all t ∈ [0, 1],
- [TLH2] H(t, 1) = c_{1}(t) for all t ∈ [0, 1],
- [TLH3] H(0, s) = H(1, s) for all s ∈ [0, 1].

Then,
$$\int_{c_0} \mathbf{F} \, \mathrm{d}c_0=\int_{c_1} \mathbf{F} \, \mathrm{d}c_1$$

Some textbooks such as Lawrence call the relationship between c_{0} and c_{1} stated in theorem 2-1 as "homotopic" and the function H: [0, 1] × [0, 1] → U as "homotopy between c_{0} and c_{1}". However, "homotopic" or "homotopy" in above-mentioned sense are different (stronger than) typical definitions of "homotopic" or "homotopy"; the latter omit condition [TLH3]. So from now on we refer to homotopy (homotope) in the sense of theorem 2-1 as a tubular homotopy (resp. tubular-homotopic). (Note: There do exist textbooks that use the terms "homotopy" and "homotopic" in the sense of Theorem 2-1. Indeed, this is very convenient for the specific problem of conservative forces. However, both uses of homotopy appear sufficiently frequently that some sort of terminology is necessary to disambiguate, and the term "tubular homotopy" adopted here serves well enough for that end.)

===== Proof of Helmholtz's theorem =====
The definitions of γ_{1}, ..., γ_{4}

In what follows, we abuse notation and use "$\oplus$" for concatenation of paths in the fundamental groupoid and "$\ominus$" for reversing the orientation of a path.

Let D = [0, 1] × [0, 1], and split ∂D into four line segments γ_{j}.
$$\begin{align}
\gamma_1:[0,1] \to D;\quad&\gamma_1(t) = (t, 0) \\
\gamma_2:[0,1] \to D;\quad&\gamma_2(s) = (1, s) \\
\gamma_3:[0,1] \to D;\quad&\gamma_3(t) = (1-t, 1) \\
\gamma_4:[0,1] \to D;\quad&\gamma_4(s) = (0, 1-s)
\end{align}$$
so that
$$\partial D = \gamma_1 \oplus \gamma_2 \oplus \gamma_3 \oplus \gamma_4$$

By our assumption that c_{0} and c_{1} are piecewise smooth homotopic, there is a piecewise smooth homotopy H: D → M
$$\begin{align}
\Gamma_i(t) &= H(\gamma_{i}(t)) && i=1, 2, 3, 4 \\
\Gamma(t) &= H(\gamma(t)) =(\Gamma_1 \oplus \Gamma_2 \oplus \Gamma_3 \oplus \Gamma_4)(t)
\end{align}$$

Let S be the image of D under H. That
$$\iint_S \nabla\times\mathbf{F}\, \mathrm{d}S = \oint_\Gamma \mathbf{F}\, \mathrm{d}\Gamma$$
follows immediately from Stokes' theorem. F is lamellar, so the left side vanishes, i.e.
$$0=\oint_\Gamma \mathbf{F}\, \mathrm{d}\Gamma = \sum_{i=1}^4 \oint_{\Gamma_i} \mathbf{F} \, \mathrm{d}\Gamma$$

As H is tubular(satisfying [TLH3]),$\Gamma_2 = \ominus \Gamma_4$ and $\Gamma_2 = \ominus \Gamma_4$. Thus the line integrals along Γ_{2}(s) and Γ_{4}(s) cancel, leaving
$$0=\oint_{\Gamma_1} \mathbf{F} \, \mathrm{d}\Gamma +\oint_{\Gamma_3} \mathbf{F} \, \mathrm{d}\Gamma$$

On the other hand, c_{1} = Γ_{1}, $c_3 = \ominus \Gamma_3$, so that the desired equality follows almost immediately.

=== Conservative forces ===
Above Helmholtz's theorem gives an explanation as to why the work done by a conservative force in changing an object's position is path independent. First, we introduce the Lemma 2-2, which is a corollary of and a special case of Helmholtz's theorem.

Lemma 2-2. Let $U\subseteq\R^3$ be an open subset, with a Lamellar vector field F and a piecewise smooth loop c_{0}: [0, 1] → U. Fix a point p ∈ U, if there is a homotopy H: [0, 1] × [0, 1] → U such that

- [SC0] H is piecewise smooth,
- [SC1] H(t, 0) = c_{0}(t) for all t ∈ [0, 1],
- [SC2] H(t, 1) = p for all t ∈ [0, 1],
- [SC3] H(0, s) = H(1, s) = p for all s ∈ [0, 1].

Then,
$$\int_{c_0} \mathbf{F} \, \mathrm{d}c_0=0$$

Above Lemma 2-2 follows from theorem 2–1. In Lemma 2-2, the existence of H satisfying [SC0] to [SC3] is crucial;the question is whether such a homotopy can be taken for arbitrary loops. If U is simply connected, such H exists. The definition of simply connected space follows:

Definition 2-2 (simply connected space). Let $M\subseteq\R^n$ be non-empty and path-connected. M is called simply connected if and only if for any continuous loop, c: [0, 1] → M there exists a continuous tubular homotopy H: [0, 1] × [0, 1] → M from c to a fixed point p ∈ c; that is,

- [SC0'] H is continuous,
- [SC1] H(t, 0) = c(t) for all t ∈ [0, 1],
- [SC2] H(t, 1) = p for all t ∈ [0, 1],
- [SC3] H(0, s) = H(1, s) = p for all s ∈ [0, 1].

The claim that "for a conservative force, the work done in changing an object's position is path independent" might seem to follow immediately if the M is simply connected. However, recall that simple-connection only guarantees the existence of a continuous homotopy satisfying [SC1-3]; we seek a piecewise smooth homotopy satisfying those conditions instead.

Fortunately, the gap in regularity is resolved by the Whitney's approximation theorem. In other words, the possibility of finding a continuous homotopy, but not being able to integrate over it, is actually eliminated with the benefit of higher mathematics. We thus obtain the following theorem.

Theorem 2-2. Let $U\subseteq\R^3$ be open and simply connected with an irrotational vector field F. For all piecewise smooth loops c: [0, 1] → U
$$\int_{c_0} \mathbf{F} \, \mathrm{d}c_0 = 0$$

=== Maxwell's equations ===
In the physics of electromagnetism, Stokes' theorem provides the justification for the equivalence of the differential form of the Maxwell–Faraday equation and the Maxwell–Ampère equation and the integral form of these equations. For Faraday's law, Stokes theorem is applied to the electric field, $\mathbf{E}$:
$$\oint_{\partial\Sigma} \mathbf{E} \cdot \mathrm{d}\boldsymbol{l}= \iint_\Sigma \mathbf{\nabla}\times \mathbf{E} \cdot \mathrm{d} \mathbf{S} .$$

For Ampère's law, Stokes' theorem is applied to the magnetic field, $\mathbf{B}$:
$$\oint_{\partial\Sigma} \mathbf{B} \cdot \mathrm{d}\boldsymbol{l}= \iint_\Sigma \mathbf{\nabla}\times \mathbf{B} \cdot \mathrm{d} \mathbf{S} .$$
