= Clebsch representation =

In physics and mathematics, the Clebsch representation of an arbitrary three-dimensional vector field $\boldsymbol{v}(\boldsymbol{x})$ is:

$\boldsymbol{v} = \boldsymbol{\nabla} \varphi + \psi\, \boldsymbol{\nabla} \chi,$

where the scalar fields $\varphi(\boldsymbol{x})$$, \psi(\boldsymbol{x})$ and $\chi(\boldsymbol{x})$ are known as Clebsch potentials or Monge potentials, named after Alfred Clebsch (1833–1872) and Gaspard Monge (1746–1818), and $\boldsymbol{\nabla}$ is the gradient operator.

== Background ==
In fluid dynamics and plasma physics, the Clebsch representation provides a means to overcome the difficulties to describe an inviscid flow with non-zero vorticity – in the Eulerian reference frame – using Lagrangian mechanics and Hamiltonian mechanics. At the critical point of such functionals the result is the Euler equations, a set of equations describing the fluid flow. Note that the mentioned difficulties do not arise when describing the flow through a variational principle in the Lagrangian reference frame. In case of surface gravity waves, the Clebsch representation leads to a rotational-flow form of Luke's variational principle.

For the Clebsch representation to be possible, the vector field $\boldsymbol{v}$ has (locally) to be bounded, continuous and sufficiently smooth. For global applicability $\boldsymbol{v}$ has to decay fast enough towards infinity. The Clebsch decomposition is not unique, and (two) additional constraints are necessary to uniquely define the Clebsch potentials. Since $\psi\boldsymbol{\nabla}\chi$ is in general not solenoidal, the Clebsch representation does not in general satisfy the Helmholtz decomposition.

== Vorticity ==
The vorticity $\boldsymbol{\omega}(\boldsymbol{x})$ is equal to

$\boldsymbol{\omega} = \boldsymbol{\nabla}\times\boldsymbol{v} = \boldsymbol{\nabla}\times\left( \boldsymbol{\nabla} \varphi + \psi\, \boldsymbol{\nabla} \chi\right) = \boldsymbol{\nabla}\psi \times \boldsymbol{\nabla}\chi,$

with the last step due to the vector calculus identity $\boldsymbol{\nabla} \times (\psi \boldsymbol{A})=\psi(\boldsymbol{\nabla}\times\boldsymbol{A})+\boldsymbol{\nabla}\psi\times\boldsymbol{A}.$ So the vorticity $\boldsymbol{\omega}$ is perpendicular to both $\boldsymbol{\nabla}\psi$ and $\boldsymbol{\nabla}\chi,$ while further the vorticity does not depend on $\varphi.$
