= Helmholtz decomposition =

Certain vector fields are the sum of an irrotational and a solenoidal vector field

In physics and mathematics, the Helmholtz decomposition theorem or the fundamental theorem of vector calculus states that certain differentiable vector fields can be resolved into the sum of an irrotational (curl-free) vector field and a solenoidal (divergence-free) vector field. In physics, often only the decomposition of sufficiently smooth, rapidly decaying vector fields in three dimensions is discussed. It is named after Hermann von Helmholtz.

== Definition ==
For a vector field $\mathbf{F} \in C^1(V, \mathbb{R}^n)$ defined on a domain $V \subseteq \mathbb{R}^n$, a Helmholtz decomposition is a pair of vector fields $\mathbf{G} \in C^1(V, \mathbb{R}^n)$ and $\mathbf{R} \in C^1(V, \mathbb{R}^n)$ such that:
$$\begin{align}
\mathbf{F}(\mathbf{r}) &= \mathbf{G}(\mathbf{r}) + \mathbf{R}(\mathbf{r}), \\
\mathbf{G}(\mathbf{r}) &= - \nabla \Phi(\mathbf{r}), \\
\nabla \cdot \mathbf{R}(\mathbf{r}) &= 0.
\end{align}$$
Here, $\Phi \in C^2(V, \mathbb{R})$ is a scalar potential, $\nabla \Phi$ is its gradient, and $\nabla \cdot \mathbf{R}$ is the divergence of the vector field $\mathbf{R}$. The irrotational vector field $\mathbf{G}$ is called a gradient field and $\mathbf{R}$ is called a solenoidal field or rotation field. This decomposition may be calculated for vector fields that satisfy certain regularity or decay conditions.

A decomposition exists for all smooth or sufficiently rapidly decaying vector fields in classical terms. If arbitrary growth at infinity is allowed, a decomposition still exists for any regular vector field in the distributional sense, though it is no longer unique due to the presence of non-trivial harmonic fields. Existence in this generalized framework follows from the surjectivity of the Laplace operator on the space of distributions. The surjectivity of this class of elliptic operators was proved by Lars Hörmander in his work on linear partial differential operators.

== History ==
The Helmholtz decomposition in three dimensions was first described in 1849 by George Gabriel Stokes for a theory of diffraction. Hermann von Helmholtz published his paper on some hydrodynamic basic equations in 1858, which was part of his research on the Helmholtz's theorems describing the motion of fluid in the vicinity of vortex lines. Their derivation required the vector fields to decay sufficiently fast at infinity. Later, this condition could be relaxed, and the Helmholtz decomposition could be extended to higher dimensions. For Riemannian manifolds, the Helmholtz-Hodge decomposition using differential geometry and tensor calculus was derived.

The decomposition has become an important tool for many problems in theoretical physics, but has also found applications in animation, computer vision as well as robotics.

== Three-dimensional space ==
In physics, the term Helmholtz theorem is sometimes used to describe a special case of Helmholt's decomposition theorem for 3 dimensions. Then, a vector potential $A$ can be defined, such that the rotation field is given by $\mathbf{R} = \nabla \times \mathbf{A}$, using the curl of a vector field.

Let $\mathbf{F}$ be a vector field on a bounded domain $V\subseteq\mathbb{R}^3$, which is twice continuously differentiable inside $V$, and let $S$ be the surface that encloses the domain $V$ with outward surface normal $\mathbf{\hat{n}}'$. Then $\mathbf{F}$ can be decomposed into a curl-free component and a divergence-free component as follows:

$$\mathbf{F}=-\nabla \Phi+\nabla\times\mathbf{A},$$
where
$$\begin{align}
\Phi(\mathbf{r}) & =\frac 1 {4\pi} \int_V \frac{\nabla'\cdot\mathbf{F} (\mathbf{r}')}{|\mathbf{r} -\mathbf{r}'|} \, \mathrm{d}V' -\frac 1 {4\pi} \oint_S \mathbf{\hat{n}}' \cdot \frac{\mathbf{F} (\mathbf{r}')}{|\mathbf{r}-\mathbf{r}'|} \, \mathrm{d}S' \\[8pt]
\mathbf{A}(\mathbf{r}) & =\frac 1 {4\pi} \int_V \frac{\nabla' \times \mathbf{F}(\mathbf{r}')}{|\mathbf{r}-\mathbf{r}'|} \, \mathrm{d}V' -\frac 1 {4\pi} \oint_S \mathbf{\hat{n}}'\times\frac{\mathbf{F} (\mathbf{r}')}{|\mathbf{r}-\mathbf{r}'|} \, \mathrm{d}S'
\end{align}$$

and $\nabla'$ is the nabla operator with respect to $\mathbf{r'}$, not $\mathbf{r}$.

If $V = \R^3$ and is therefore unbounded, and $\mathbf{F}$ vanishes faster than $1/r$ as $r \to \infty$, then one has

$$\begin{align}
\Phi(\mathbf{r}) & =\frac{1}{4\pi}\int_{\R^3} \frac{\nabla' \cdot \mathbf{F} (\mathbf{r}')}{|\mathbf{r}-\mathbf{r}'|} \, \mathrm{d}V' \\[8pt]
\mathbf{A} (\mathbf{r}) & =\frac{1}{4\pi}\int_{\R^3} \frac{\nabla'\times\mathbf{F} (\mathbf{r}')}{|\mathbf{r}-\mathbf{r}'|} \, \mathrm{d}V'
\end{align}$$
This holds in particular if $\mathbf F$ is twice continuously differentiable in $\mathbb R^3$ and of bounded support.

=== Derivation ===
Proof

Suppose we have a vector function $\mathbf{F}(\mathbf{r})$ of which we know the curl, $\nabla\times\mathbf{F}$, and the divergence, $\nabla\cdot\mathbf{F}$, in the domain and the fields on the boundary. Writing the function using the delta function in the form
$$\delta^3(\mathbf{r}-\mathbf{r}')=-\frac 1 {4\pi} \nabla^2 \frac{1}{|\mathbf{r}-\mathbf{r}'|}\, ,$$
where $\nabla^2$ is the Laplacian operator, we have

$$\begin{align}
\mathbf{F}(\mathbf{r}) &= \int_V \mathbf{F}\left(\mathbf{r}'\right)\delta^3 (\mathbf{r}-\mathbf{r}') \mathrm{d}V' \\
&=\int_V\mathbf{F}(\mathbf{r}')\left(-\frac{1}{4\pi}\nabla^2\frac{1}{\left|\mathbf{r}-\mathbf{r}'\right|}\right)\mathrm{d}V' \end{align}$$

Now, changing the meaning of $\nabla^2$ to the vector Laplacian operator (we have the right to do so because this laplacian is with respect to $\mathbf{r}$ therefore it sees the vector field $\mathbf{F}(\mathbf{r'})$ as a constant), we can move $\mathbf{F}(\mathbf{r'})$ to the right of the$\nabla^2$operator.

$$\begin{align}\mathbf{F}(\mathbf{r})&=\int_V-\frac{1}{4\pi}\nabla^2\frac{\mathbf{F}(\mathbf{r}')}{\left|\mathbf{r}-\mathbf{r}'\right|}\mathrm{d}V' \\
&=-\frac{1}{4\pi}\nabla^2 \int_V \frac{\mathbf{F}(\mathbf{r}')}{\left|\mathbf{r}-\mathbf{r}'\right|}\mathrm{d}V' \\
&=-\frac{1}{4\pi}\left[\nabla\left(\nabla\cdot\int_V\frac{\mathbf{F}(\mathbf{r}')}{\left|\mathbf{r}-\mathbf{r}'\right|}\mathrm{d}V'\right)-\nabla\times\left(\nabla\times\int_V\frac{\mathbf{F}(\mathbf{r}')}{\left|\mathbf{r}-\mathbf{r}'\right|}\mathrm{d}V'\right)\right] \\
&= -\frac{1}{4\pi} \left[\nabla\left(\int_V\mathbf{F}(\mathbf{r}')\cdot\nabla\frac{1}{\left|\mathbf{r}-\mathbf{r}'\right|}\mathrm{d}V'\right)+\nabla\times\left(\int_V\mathbf{F}(\mathbf{r}')\times\nabla\frac{1}{\left|\mathbf{r}-\mathbf{r}'\right|}\mathrm{d}V'\right)\right] \\
&=-\frac{1}{4\pi}\left[-\nabla\left(\int_V\mathbf{F}(\mathbf{r}')\cdot\nabla'\frac{1}{\left|\mathbf{r}-\mathbf{r}'\right|}\mathrm{d}V'\right)-\nabla\times\left(\int_V\mathbf{F} (\mathbf{r}')\times\nabla'\frac{1}{\left|\mathbf{r}-\mathbf{r}'\right|}\mathrm{d}V'\right)\right]
\end{align}$$

where we have used the vector Laplacian identity:
$$\nabla^{2}\mathbf{a}=\nabla (\nabla\cdot\mathbf{a})-\nabla\times (\nabla\times\mathbf{a}) \ ,$$

differentiation/integration with respect to $\mathbf r'$by $\nabla'/\mathrm dV',$ and in the last line, linearity of function arguments:
$$\nabla\frac{1}{\left|\mathbf{r}-\mathbf{r}'\right|}=-\nabla'\frac{1}{\left|\mathbf{r}-\mathbf{r}'\right|}\ .$$

(But the transformation

$$\int_V-\frac{1}{4\pi}\nabla^2\frac{\mathbf{F}(\mathbf{r}')}{\left|\mathbf{r}-\mathbf{r}'\right|}\mathrm{d}V' =
-\frac{1}{4\pi}\nabla^2 \int_V \frac{\mathbf{F}(\mathbf{r}')}{\left|\mathbf{r}-\mathbf{r}'\right|}\mathrm{d}V'$$
is not mathematically correct since the last integral diverges as ln R at R tends to infinity. This divergence of the integral is significant for the electromagnetic fields
$$\mathbf{E}\sim 1/R^2$$
- this near zone fields. (No the above is not generally true , consider the triple integral
$$\int_0^1\int_0^1\int_0^1 \frac{1}{\sqrt{x^2+y^2+z^2}}dxdydz=1.19004$$
, looks like it diverges but it converges. If the vector field is twice differentiable, hence continuous with continuous first partial derivatives all the integrals in this proof converge)) Then using the vectorial identities

$$\begin{align}
\mathbf{a}\cdot\nabla\psi &=-\psi(\nabla\cdot\mathbf{a})+\nabla\cdot (\psi\mathbf{a}) \\
\mathbf{a}\times\nabla\psi &=\psi(\nabla\times\mathbf{a})-\nabla \times (\psi\mathbf{a})
\end{align}$$

we get
$$\begin{align}
\mathbf{F}(\mathbf{r})=-\frac{1}{4\pi}\bigg[
&-\nabla\left(-\int_{V}\frac{\nabla'\cdot\mathbf{F}\left(\mathbf{r}'\right)}{\left|\mathbf{r}-\mathbf{r}'\right|}\mathrm{d}V'+\int_{V}\nabla'\cdot\frac{\mathbf{F}\left(\mathbf{r}'\right)}{\left|\mathbf{r}-\mathbf{r}'\right|}\mathrm{d}V'\right)
\\&
-\nabla\times\left(\int_{V}\frac{\nabla'\times\mathbf{F}\left(\mathbf{r}'\right)}{\left|\mathbf{r}-\mathbf{r}'\right|}\mathrm{d}V'
- \int_{V}\nabla'\times\frac{\mathbf{F}\left(\mathbf{r}'\right)}{\left|\mathbf{r}-\mathbf{r}'\right|}\mathrm{d}V'\right)\bigg].
\end{align}$$

Thanks to the divergence theorem the equation can be rewritten as

$$\begin{align}
\mathbf{F} (\mathbf{r})
&=
-\frac{1}{4\pi}
\bigg[
-\nabla\left(
-\int_{V}
\frac{
\nabla'\cdot\mathbf{F}\left(\mathbf{r}'\right)
}{
\left|\mathbf{r}-\mathbf{r}'\right|
} \mathrm{d}V'
+
\oint_{S}\mathbf{\hat{n}}'\cdot
\frac{
\mathbf{F}\left(\mathbf{r}'\right)
}{
\left|\mathbf{r}-\mathbf{r}'\right|
}\mathrm{d}S'
\right)
\\
&\qquad\qquad
-\nabla\times\left(\int_{V}\frac{\nabla'\times\mathbf{F}\left(\mathbf{r}'\right)}{\left|\mathbf{r}-\mathbf{r}'\right|}\mathrm{d}V'
-\oint_{S}\mathbf{\hat{n}}'\times\frac{\mathbf{F}\left(\mathbf{r}'\right)}{\left|\mathbf{r}-\mathbf{r}'\right|}\mathrm{d}S'\right)
\bigg]
\\
&=
-\nabla\left[
\frac{1}{4\pi}\int_{V}
\frac{
\nabla'\cdot\mathbf{F}\left(\mathbf{r}'\right)
}{\left|
\mathbf{r}-\mathbf{r}'
\right|}
\mathrm{d}V'
-
\frac{1}{4\pi}
\oint_{S}\mathbf{\hat{n}}' \cdot
\frac{
\mathbf{F}\left(\mathbf{r}'\right)
}{
\left|
\mathbf{r}-\mathbf{r}'
\right|
}
\mathrm{d}S'
\right]
\\
&\quad
+
\nabla\times
\left[
\frac{1}{4\pi}\int_{V}
\frac{
\nabla '\times\mathbf{F}\left(\mathbf{r}'\right)
}{
\left|
\mathbf{r}-\mathbf{r}'
\right|
}
\mathrm{d}V'
-
\frac{1}{4\pi}\oint_{S}
\mathbf{\hat{n}}'
\times
\frac{
\mathbf{F}\left(\mathbf{r}'\right)
}{
\left|
\mathbf{r}-\mathbf{r}'
\right|
}
\mathrm{d}S'
\right]
\end{align}$$

with outward surface normal $\mathbf{\hat{n}}'$.

Defining

$$\Phi(\mathbf{r})\equiv\frac{1}{4\pi}\int_{V}\frac{\nabla'\cdot\mathbf{F}\left(\mathbf{r}'\right)}{\left|\mathbf{r}-\mathbf{r}'\right|}\mathrm{d}V'-\frac{1}{4\pi}\oint_{S}\mathbf{\hat{n}}'\cdot\frac{\mathbf{F}\left(\mathbf{r}'\right)}{\left|\mathbf{r}-\mathbf{r}'\right|}\mathrm{d}S'$$
$$\mathbf{A}(\mathbf{r})\equiv\frac{1}{4\pi}\int_{V}\frac{\nabla'\times\mathbf{F}\left(\mathbf{r}'\right)}{\left|\mathbf{r}-\mathbf{r}'\right|}\mathrm{d}V'-\frac{1}{4\pi}\oint_{S}\mathbf{\hat{n}}'\times\frac{\mathbf{F}\left(\mathbf{r}'\right)}{\left|\mathbf{r}-\mathbf{r}'\right|}\mathrm{d}S'$$

we finally obtain
$$\mathbf{F}=-\nabla\Phi+\nabla\times\mathbf{A}.$$

=== Solution space ===
If $(\Phi_1, {\mathbf A_1})$ is a Helmholtz decomposition of $\mathbf F$, then $(\Phi_2, {\mathbf A_2})$ is another decomposition if, and only if,

$\Phi_1-\Phi_2 = \lambda \quad$ and $\quad \mathbf{A}_1 - \mathbf{A}_2 = {\mathbf A}_\lambda + \nabla \varphi,$
where
- $\lambda$ is a harmonic scalar field,
- ${\mathbf A}_\lambda$ is a vector field which fulfills $\nabla\times {\mathbf A}_\lambda = \nabla \lambda,$
- $\varphi$ is a scalar field.

Proof: Set $\lambda = \Phi_2 - \Phi_1$ and ${\mathbf B = A_2 - A_1}$. According to the definition of the Helmholtz decomposition, the condition is equivalent to

$$-\nabla \lambda + \nabla \times \mathbf B = 0$$.

Taking the divergence of each member of this equation yields $\nabla^2 \lambda = 0$, hence $\lambda$ is harmonic.

Conversely, given any harmonic function $\lambda$, $\nabla \lambda$ is solenoidal since
$$\nabla\cdot (\nabla \lambda) = \nabla^2 \lambda = 0.$$

Thus, according to the above section, there exists a vector field ${\mathbf A}_\lambda$ such that $\nabla \lambda = \nabla\times {\mathbf A}_\lambda$.

If ${\mathbf A'}_\lambda$ is another such vector field, then $\mathbf C = {\mathbf A}_\lambda - {\mathbf A'}_\lambda$ fulfills $\nabla \times {\mathbf C} = 0$, hence $C = \nabla \varphi$ for some scalar field $\varphi$.

=== Fields with prescribed divergence and curl ===
The term "Helmholtz theorem" can also refer to the following. Let C be a solenoidal vector field and d a scalar field on R^{3} which are sufficiently smooth and which vanish faster than 1/r^{2} at infinity. Then there exists a vector field F such that

$$\nabla \cdot \mathbf{F} = d \quad \text{ and } \quad \nabla \times \mathbf{F} = \mathbf{C};$$

if additionally the vector field F vanishes as r → ∞, then F is unique.

In other words, a vector field can be constructed with both a specified divergence and a specified curl, and if it also vanishes at infinity, it is uniquely specified by its divergence and curl. This theorem is of great importance in electrostatics, since Maxwell's equations for the electric and magnetic fields in the static case are of exactly this type. The proof is by a construction generalizing the one given above: we set

$$\mathbf{F} = \nabla(\mathcal{G} (d)) - \nabla \times (\mathcal{G}(\mathbf{C})),$$

where $\mathcal{G}$ represents the Newtonian potential operator. (When acting on a vector field, such as ∇ × F, it is defined to act on each component.)

=== Weak formulation ===
The Helmholtz decomposition can be generalized by reducing the regularity assumptions (the need for the existence of strong derivatives). Suppose Ω is a bounded, simply-connected, Lipschitz domain. Every square-integrable vector field u ∈ (L^{2}(Ω))^{3} has an orthogonal decomposition:

$$\mathbf{u}=\nabla\varphi+\nabla \times \mathbf{A}$$

where φ is in the Sobolev space H^{1}(Ω) of square-integrable functions on Ω whose partial derivatives defined in the distribution sense are square integrable, and A ∈ H(curl, Ω), the Sobolev space of vector fields consisting of square integrable vector fields with square integrable curl.

For a slightly smoother vector field u ∈ H(curl, Ω), a similar decomposition holds:

$$\mathbf{u}=\nabla\varphi+\mathbf{v}$$

where φ ∈ H^{1}(Ω), v ∈ (H^{1}(Ω))^{d}.

=== Derivation from the Fourier transform ===
Note that in the theorem stated here, we have imposed the condition that if $\mathbf{F}$ is not defined on a bounded domain, then $\mathbf{F}$ shall decay faster than $1/r$. Thus, the Fourier transform of $\mathbf{F}$, denoted as $\mathbf{G}$, is guaranteed to exist. We apply the convention
$$\mathbf{F}(\mathbf{r}) = \iiint \mathbf{G}(\mathbf{k}) e^{i\mathbf{k} \cdot \mathbf{r}} dV_k$$

The Fourier transform of a scalar field is a scalar field, and the Fourier transform of a vector field is a vector field of same dimension.

Now consider the following scalar and vector fields:
$$\begin{align}
G_\Phi(\mathbf{k}) &= i \frac{\mathbf{k} \cdot \mathbf{G}(\mathbf{k})}{\|\mathbf{k}\|^2} \\
\mathbf{G}_\mathbf{A}(\mathbf{k}) &= i \frac{\mathbf{k} \times \mathbf{G}(\mathbf{k})}{\|\mathbf{k}\|^2}  \\ [8pt]
\Phi(\mathbf{r}) &= \iiint G_\Phi(\mathbf{k}) e^{i \mathbf{k} \cdot \mathbf{r}} dV_k \\
\mathbf{A}(\mathbf{r}) &= \iiint \mathbf{G}_\mathbf{A}(\mathbf{k}) e^{i \mathbf{k} \cdot \mathbf{r}} dV_k
\end{align}$$

Hence

$$\begin{align}
\mathbf{G}(\mathbf{k}) &= - i \mathbf{k} G_\Phi(\mathbf{k}) + i \mathbf{k} \times \mathbf{G}_\mathbf{A}(\mathbf{k}) \\ [6pt]
\mathbf{F}(\mathbf{r}) &= -\iiint i \mathbf{k} G_\Phi(\mathbf{k}) e^{i \mathbf{k} \cdot \mathbf{r}} dV_k + \iiint i \mathbf{k} \times \mathbf{G}_\mathbf{A}(\mathbf{k}) e^{i \mathbf{k} \cdot \mathbf{r}} dV_k \\
&= - \nabla \Phi(\mathbf{r}) +  \nabla \times \mathbf{A}(\mathbf{r})
\end{align}$$

=== Longitudinal and transverse fields ===
A terminology often used in physics refers to the curl-free component of a vector field as the longitudinal component and the divergence-free component as the transverse component. This terminology comes from the following construction: Compute the three-dimensional Fourier transform $\hat\mathbf{F}$ of the vector field $\mathbf{F}$. Then decompose this field, at each point k, into two components, one of which points longitudinally, i.e. parallel to k, the other of which points in the transverse direction, i.e. perpendicular to k. So far, we have

$$\hat\mathbf{F} (\mathbf{k}) = \hat\mathbf{F}_t (\mathbf{k}) + \hat\mathbf{F}_l (\mathbf{k})$$
$$\mathbf{k} \cdot \hat\mathbf{F}_t(\mathbf{k}) = 0.$$
$$\mathbf{k} \times \hat\mathbf{F}_l(\mathbf{k}) = \mathbf{0}.$$

Now we apply an inverse Fourier transform to each of these components. Using properties of Fourier transforms, we derive:

$$\mathbf{F}(\mathbf{r}) = \mathbf{F}_t(\mathbf{r})+\mathbf{F}_l(\mathbf{r})$$
$$\nabla \cdot \mathbf{F}_t (\mathbf{r}) = 0$$
$$\nabla \times \mathbf{F}_l (\mathbf{r}) = \mathbf{0}$$

Since $\nabla\times(\nabla\Phi)=0$ and $\nabla\cdot(\nabla\times\mathbf{A})=0$,

we can get

$$\mathbf{F}_t=\nabla\times\mathbf{A}=\frac{1}{4\pi}\nabla\times\int_V\frac{\nabla'\times\mathbf{F}}{\left|\mathbf{r}-\mathbf{r}'\right|}\mathrm{d}V'$$
$$\mathbf{F}_l=-\nabla\Phi=-\frac{1}{4\pi}\nabla\int_V\frac{\nabla'\cdot\mathbf{F}}{\left|\mathbf{r}-\mathbf{r}'\right|}\mathrm{d}V'$$

so this is indeed the Helmholtz decomposition.

== Generalization to arbitrary dimensions ==
Informally speaking, in $\mathbb{R}^d$, the Helmholtz decomposition can be expressed by $\mathbf{F} = -\nabla \Phi + \mathbf{R}$ where $\Phi$ is any scalar function that solves the Poisson equation $-\nabla^2 \Phi = f$, where $f = \nabla \cdot \mathbf{F}$ is the divergence of the vector field $\mathbf{F}$ in $\mathbb{R}^d$, and $\mathbf{R} = \mathbf{F} + \nabla \Phi$ is divergence free: $\nabla \cdot \mathbf{R} = 0$. Thus the existence of Helmholtz decomposition a consequence of the existence of the solution of the Poisson equation $-\nabla^2 \Phi = f$.

=== Matrix approach ===
The generalization to $d$ dimensions cannot be done with a vector potential, since the rotation operator and the cross product are defined (as vectors) only in three dimensions.

Let $\mathbf{F}$ be a vector field in $\mathbb{R}^d$ which decays faster than $|\mathbf{r}|^{-\delta}$ for $|\mathbf{r}| \to \infty$ and $\delta > 2$.

The scalar potential is defined similar to the three dimensional case as:
$$\Phi(\mathbf{r}) = - \int_{\mathbb{R}^d} \operatorname{div}(\mathbf{F}(\mathbf{r}')) K(\mathbf{r}, \mathbf{r}') \mathrm{d}V' = - \int_{\mathbb{R}^d} \sum_i \frac{\partial F_i}{\partial r_i}(\mathbf{r}') K(\mathbf{r}, \mathbf{r}') \mathrm{d}V',$$
where as the integration kernel $K(\mathbf{r}, \mathbf{r}')$ is again the fundamental solution of Laplace's equation, but in d-dimensional space:
$$K(\mathbf{r}, \mathbf{r}') = \begin{cases}  \frac{1}{2\pi} \log{ | \mathbf{r}-\mathbf{r}' | } &  d=2,  \\    \frac{1}{d(2-d)V_d} | \mathbf{r}-\mathbf{r}' | ^{2-d} &  \text{otherwise}, \end{cases}$$
with $V_d = \pi^\frac{d}{2} / \Gamma\big(\tfrac{d}{2}+1\big)$ the volume of the d-dimensional unit balls and $\Gamma(\mathbf{r})$ the gamma function.

For $d = 3$, $V_d$ is just equal to $\frac{4 \pi}{3}$, yielding the same prefactor as above. The rotational potential is an antisymmetric matrix with the elements:
$$A_{ij}(\mathbf{r}) = \int_{\mathbb{R}^d} \left( \frac{\partial F_i}{\partial x_j}(\mathbf{r}') - \frac{\partial F_j}{\partial x_i}(\mathbf{r}') \right) K(\mathbf{r}, \mathbf{r}') \mathrm{d}V'.$$
Above the diagonal are $\textstyle\binom{d}{2}$ entries which occur again mirrored at the diagonal, but with a negative sign. In the three-dimensional case, the matrix elements just correspond to the components of the vector potential $\mathbf{A} = [A_1, A_2, A_3] = [A_{23}, A_{31}, A_{12}]$. However, such a matrix potential can be written as a vector only in the three-dimensional case, because $\textstyle\binom{d}{2} = d$ is valid only for $d = 3$.

As in the three-dimensional case, the gradient field is defined as
$$\mathbf{G}(\mathbf{r}) = - \nabla \Phi(\mathbf{r}).$$
The rotational field, on the other hand, is defined in the general case as the row divergence of the matrix:
$$\mathbf{R}(\mathbf{r}) = \left[ \sum\nolimits_k \partial_{r_k} A_{ik}(\mathbf{r}); {1 \leq i \leq d} \right].$$
In three-dimensional space, this is equivalent to the rotation of the vector potential.

=== Tensor approach ===
In a $d$-dimensional vector space with $d\neq 3$, $-\frac{1}{4\pi\left|\mathbf{r}-\mathbf{r}'\right|}$ can be replaced by the appropriate Green's function for the Laplacian, defined by
$$\nabla^2 G(\mathbf{r},\mathbf{r}') = \frac{\partial}{\partial r_\mu}\frac{\partial}{\partial r_\mu}G(\mathbf{r},\mathbf{r}') = \delta^d(\mathbf{r}-\mathbf{r}')$$
where Einstein summation convention is used for the index $\mu$. For example, $G(\mathbf{r},\mathbf{r}')=\frac{1}{2\pi}\ln\left|\mathbf{r}-\mathbf{r}'\right|$ in 2D.

Following the same steps as above, we can write
$$F_\mu(\mathbf{r}) = \int_V F_\mu(\mathbf{r}') \frac{\partial}{\partial r_\mu}\frac{\partial}{\partial r_\mu}G(\mathbf{r},\mathbf{r}') \,\mathrm{d}^d \mathbf{r}'
= \delta_{\mu\nu}\delta_{\rho\sigma}\int_V F_\nu(\mathbf{r}') \frac{\partial}{\partial r_\rho}\frac{\partial}{\partial r_\sigma}G(\mathbf{r},\mathbf{r}') \,\mathrm{d}^d \mathbf{r}'$$
where $\delta_{\mu\nu}$ is the Kronecker delta (and the summation convention is again used). In place of the definition of the vector Laplacian used above, we now make use of an identity for the Levi-Civita symbol $\varepsilon$,
$$\varepsilon_{\alpha\mu\rho}\varepsilon_{\alpha\nu\sigma} = (d-2)!(\delta_{\mu\nu}\delta_{\rho\sigma} - \delta_{\mu\sigma}\delta_{\nu\rho})$$
which is valid in $d\ge 2$ dimensions, where $\alpha$ is a $(d-2)$-component multi-index. This gives
$$F_\mu(\mathbf{r}) = \delta_{\mu\sigma}\delta_{\nu\rho}\int_V F_\nu(\mathbf{r}') \frac{\partial}{\partial r_\rho}\frac{\partial}{\partial r_\sigma}G(\mathbf{r},\mathbf{r}') \,\mathrm{d}^d \mathbf{r}'
+ \frac{1}{(d-2)!}\varepsilon_{\alpha\mu\rho}\varepsilon_{\alpha\nu\sigma} \int_V F_\nu(\mathbf{r}') \frac{\partial}{\partial r_\rho}\frac{\partial}{\partial r_\sigma}G(\mathbf{r},\mathbf{r}') \,\mathrm{d}^d \mathbf{r}'$$

We can therefore write
$$F_\mu(\mathbf{r}) = -\frac{\partial}{\partial r_\mu} \Phi(\mathbf{r}) + \varepsilon_{\mu\rho\alpha}\frac{\partial}{\partial r_\rho} A_{\alpha}(\mathbf{r})$$
where
$$\begin{aligned}
\Phi(\mathbf{r}) &= -\int_V F_\nu(\mathbf{r}') \frac{\partial}{\partial r_\nu}G(\mathbf{r},\mathbf{r}') \,\mathrm{d}^d \mathbf{r}'\\
A_{\alpha} &= \frac{1}{(d-2)!}\varepsilon_{\alpha\nu\sigma} \int_V F_\nu(\mathbf{r}') \frac{\partial}{\partial r_\sigma}G(\mathbf{r},\mathbf{r}') \,\mathrm{d}^d \mathbf{r}'
\end{aligned}$$
Note that the vector potential is replaced by a rank-$(d-2)$ tensor in $d$ dimensions.

Because $G(\mathbf{r},\mathbf{r}')$ is a function of only $\mathbf{r}-\mathbf{r}'$, one can replace $\frac{\partial}{\partial r_\mu}\rightarrow - \frac{\partial}{\partial r'_\mu}$, giving
$$\begin{aligned}
\Phi(\mathbf{r}) &= \int_V F_\nu(\mathbf{r}') \frac{\partial}{\partial r'_\nu}G(\mathbf{r},\mathbf{r}') \,\mathrm{d}^d \mathbf{r}'\\
A_{\alpha} &= -\frac{1}{(d-2)!}\varepsilon_{\alpha\nu\sigma} \int_V F_\nu(\mathbf{r}') \frac{\partial}{\partial r_\sigma'}G(\mathbf{r},\mathbf{r}') \,\mathrm{d}^d \mathbf{r}'
\end{aligned}$$
Integration by parts can then be used to give
$$\begin{aligned}
\Phi(\mathbf{r}) &= -\int_V G(\mathbf{r},\mathbf{r}')\frac{\partial}{\partial r'_\nu}F_\nu(\mathbf{r}') \,\mathrm{d}^d \mathbf{r}' + \oint_{S} G(\mathbf{r},\mathbf{r}') F_\nu(\mathbf{r}') \hat{n}'_\nu \,\mathrm{d}^{d-1} \mathbf{r}'\\
A_{\alpha} &= \frac{1}{(d-2)!}\varepsilon_{\alpha\nu\sigma} \int_V G(\mathbf{r},\mathbf{r}') \frac{\partial}{\partial r_\sigma'}F_\nu(\mathbf{r}')  \,\mathrm{d}^d \mathbf{r}'- \frac{1}{(d-2)!}\varepsilon_{\alpha\nu\sigma} \oint_{S} G(\mathbf{r},\mathbf{r}') F_\nu(\mathbf{r}')  \hat{n}'_\sigma \,\mathrm{d}^{d-1} \mathbf{r}'
\end{aligned}$$
where $S=\partial V$ is the boundary of $V$. These expressions are analogous to those given above for three-dimensional space.

For a further generalization to manifolds, see the discussion of Hodge decomposition below.

== Differential forms ==
The Hodge decomposition is closely related to the Helmholtz decomposition, generalizing from vector fields on R^{3} to differential forms on a Riemannian manifold M. Most formulations of the Hodge decomposition require M to be compact. Since this is not true of R^{3}, the Hodge decomposition theorem is not strictly a generalization of the Helmholtz theorem. However, the compactness restriction in the usual formulation of the Hodge decomposition can be replaced by suitable decay assumptions at infinity on the differential forms involved, giving a proper generalization of the Helmholtz theorem.

== Extensions to fields not decaying at infinity ==
Most textbooks only deal with vector fields decaying faster than $|\mathbf{r}|^{-\delta}$ with $\delta > 1$ at infinity. However, Otto Blumenthal showed in 1905 that an adapted integration kernel can be used to integrate fields decaying faster than $|\mathbf{r}|^{-\delta}$ with $\delta > 0$, which is substantially less strict. To achieve this, the kernel $K(\mathbf{r}, \mathbf{r}')$ in the convolution integrals has to be replaced by $K'(\mathbf{r}, \mathbf{r}') = K(\mathbf{r}, \mathbf{r}') - K(0, \mathbf{r}')$. With even more complex integration kernels, solutions can be found even for divergent functions that need not grow faster than polynomial.

For all analytic vector fields that need not go to zero even at infinity, methods based on partial integration and the Cauchy formula for repeated integration can be used to compute closed-form solutions of the rotation and scalar potentials, as in the case of multivariate polynomial, sine, cosine, and exponential functions.

== Uniqueness of the solution ==
In general, the Helmholtz decomposition is not uniquely defined. A harmonic function $H(\mathbf{r})$ is a function that satisfies $\Delta H(\mathbf{r}) = 0$. By adding $H(\mathbf{r})$ to the scalar potential $\Phi(\mathbf{r})$, a different Helmholtz decomposition can be obtained:

$$\begin{align}
\mathbf{G}'(\mathbf{r}) &= \nabla (\Phi(\mathbf{r}) + H(\mathbf{r})) = \mathbf{G}(\mathbf{r}) + \nabla H(\mathbf{r}),\\
\mathbf{R}'(\mathbf{r}) &= \mathbf{R}(\mathbf{r}) - \nabla H(\mathbf{r}).
\end{align}$$

For vector fields $\mathbf{F}$, decaying at infinity, it is a plausible choice that scalar and rotation potentials also decay at infinity. Because $H(\mathbf{r}) = 0$ is the only harmonic function with this property, which follows from Liouville's theorem, this guarantees the uniqueness of the gradient and rotation fields.

This uniqueness does not apply to the potentials: In the three-dimensional case, the scalar and vector potential jointly have four components, whereas the vector field has only three. The vector field is invariant to gauge transformations and the choice of appropriate potentials known as gauge fixing is the subject of gauge theory. Important examples from physics are the Lorenz gauge condition and the Coulomb gauge. An alternative is to use the poloidal–toroidal decomposition.

== Applications ==
=== Electrodynamics ===
The Helmholtz theorem is of particular interest in electrodynamics, since it can be used to write Maxwell's equations in the potential image and solve them more easily. The Helmholtz decomposition can be used to prove that, given electric current density and charge density, the electric field and the magnetic flux density can be determined. They are unique if the densities vanish at infinity and one assumes the same for the potentials.

=== Fluid dynamics ===
In fluid dynamics, the Helmholtz projection plays an important role, especially for the solvability theory of the Navier-Stokes equations. If the Helmholtz projection is applied to the linearized incompressible Navier-Stokes equations, the Stokes equation is obtained. This depends only on the velocity of the particles in the flow, but no longer on the static pressure, allowing the equation to be reduced to one unknown. However, both equations, the Stokes and linearized equations, are equivalent. The operator $P\Delta$ is called the Stokes operator.

=== Dynamical systems theory ===
In the theory of dynamical systems, Helmholtz decomposition can be used to determine "quasipotentials" as well as to compute Lyapunov functions in some cases.

For some dynamical systems such as the Lorenz system (Edward N. Lorenz, 1963), a simplified model for atmospheric convection, a closed-form expression of the Helmholtz decomposition can be obtained:
$$\dot \mathbf{r} = \mathbf{F}(\mathbf{r}) = \big[a (r_2-r_1), r_1 (b-r_3)-r_2, r_1 r_2-c r_3 \big].$$
The Helmholtz decomposition of $\mathbf{F}(\mathbf{r})$, with the scalar potential $\Phi(\mathbf{r}) = \tfrac{a}{2} r_1^2 + \tfrac{1}{2} r_2^2 + \tfrac{c}{2} r_3^2$ is given as:

$$\mathbf{G}(\mathbf{r}) = \big[-a r_1, -r_2, -c r_3 \big],$$
$$\mathbf{R}(\mathbf{r}) = \big[+ a r_2, b r_1 - r_1 r_3, r_1 r_2 \big].$$

The quadratic scalar potential provides motion in the direction of the coordinate origin, which is responsible for the stable fix point for some parameter range. For other parameters, the rotation field ensures that a strange attractor is created, causing the model to exhibit a butterfly effect.

=== Medical Imaging ===
In magnetic resonance elastography, a variant of MR imaging where mechanical waves are used to probe the viscoelasticity of organs, the Helmholtz decomposition is sometimes used to separate the measured displacement fields into its shear component (divergence-free) and its compression component (curl-free). In this way, the complex shear modulus can be calculated without contributions from compression waves.

=== Computer animation and robotics ===
The Helmholtz decomposition is also used in the field of computer engineering. This includes robotics, image reconstruction but also computer animation, where the decomposition is used for realistic visualization of fluids or vector fields.

== See also ==
- Clebsch representation for a related decomposition of vector fields
- Darwin Lagrangian for an application
- Poloidal–toroidal decomposition for a further decomposition of the divergence-free component $\nabla \times \mathbf{A}$.
- Scalar–vector–tensor decomposition
- Hodge theory generalizing Helmholtz decomposition
- Polar factorization theorem
- Helmholtz–Leray decomposition used for defining the Leray projection
