= Leray projection =

The Leray projection, also known as the Helmholtz–Leray projection, is a mathematical tool used to describe the motion of fluids like air or water. It takes a vector field—essentially a description of how something moves at each point in space—and extracts the part that represents incompressible (divergence-free) flow. This is especially useful in studying fluid dynamics, such as in the Navier–Stokes equations that describe how fluids move.

It is named after French mathematician Jean Leray.

== Definition ==
The basic idea of the Leray projection is that any vector field in three dimensions admits a decomposition into a curl-free part, and a divergence-free part. This is known as the Helmholtz decomposition. (More generally, the Hodge decomposition applies in higher dimensions: see for instance the Euler-Arnold equations.)

=== By Helmholtz–Leray decomposition ===
One can show that a given vector field $\mathbf u$ on $\mathbb R^3$ can be decomposed as

$$\mathbf u = \nabla q + \mathbf v, \quad \text{with} \quad \nabla \cdot \mathbf v = 0.$$

Different than the usual Helmholtz decomposition, the Helmholtz–Leray decomposition of $\mathbf u$ is unique (up to an additive constant for $q$ ). Then we can define $\mathbb P(\mathbf u)$ as

$$\mathbb P(\mathbf u) = \mathbf v.$$

The Leray projector is defined similarly on function spaces other than the Schwartz space, and on different domains with different boundary conditions. The four properties listed below will continue to hold in those cases.

=== By pseudo-differential approach ===
For vector fields $\mathbf u$ (in any dimension $n \geq 2$), the Leray projection $\mathbb P$ is defined by

$$\mathbb P(\mathbf u) = \mathbf u - \nabla \Delta^{-1} (\nabla \cdot \mathbf u).$$

This definition must be understood in the sense of pseudo-differential operators: its matrix valued Fourier multiplier $m(\xi)$ is given by

$$m(\xi)_{kj} = \delta_{kj}-\frac{\xi_k \xi_j}{ \vert \xi \vert^2},\quad 1 \leq k,j \leq n.$$

Here, $\delta$ is the Kronecker delta. Formally, it means that for all $\mathbf u \in \mathcal S(\R^n)^n$, one has

$$\mathbb P(\mathbf u)_k(x) = \frac{1}{(2\pi)^{n/2}} \int_{\R^n}  \left( \delta_{kj}-\frac{\xi_k \xi_j}{ \vert \xi \vert^2}\right) \widehat{\mathbf u}_j(\xi) \, e^{i \xi \cdot  x}\, \mathrm d\xi,\quad 1 \leq k \leq n$$

where $\mathcal S(\R^n)$ is the Schwartz space. We use here the Einstein notation for the summation.

== Properties ==
The Leray projection has the following properties:

1. The Leray projection is a projection: $\mathbb P [\mathbb P(\mathbf u)] = \mathbb P(\mathbf u)$ for all $\mathbf u \in \mathcal S(\R^n)^n$.
2. The Leray projection is a divergence-free operator: $\nabla \cdot [\mathbb P(\mathbf u)] = 0$ for all $\mathbf u \in \mathcal S(\R^n)^n$.
3. The Leray projection is simply the identity for the divergence-free vector fields: $\mathbb P(\mathbf u) = \mathbf u$ for all $\mathbf u \in \mathcal S(\R^n)^n$ such that $\nabla \cdot \mathbf u =0$.
4. The Leray projection vanishes for the vector fields coming from a potential: $\mathbb P(\nabla \phi) = 0$ for all $\phi \in \mathcal S(\R^n)$.

== Application to Navier–Stokes equations ==
The incompressible Navier–Stokes equations are the partial differential equations given by

$$\frac{\partial \mathbf{u}}{\partial t} -\nu\,\Delta \mathbf{u} + ( \mathbf{u}\cdot\nabla ) \mathbf{u} + \nabla p = \mathbf f$$
$$\nabla \cdot \mathbf{u} = 0$$

where $\mathbf{u}$ is the velocity of the fluid, $p$ the pressure, $\nu > 0$ the viscosity and $\mathbf f$ the external volumetric force.

By applying the Leray projection to the first equation, we may rewrite the Navier-Stokes equations as an abstract differential equation on an infinite dimensional phase space, such as $C^0\left(0,T;L^2(\Omega)\right)$, the space of continuous functions from $[0,T]$ to $L^2(\Omega)$ where $T > 0$ and $L^2(\Omega)$ is the space of square-integrable functions on the physical domain $\Omega$:

$$\frac{\mathrm{d} \mathbf{u}}{\mathrm{d} t} + \nu\, A\mathbf{u} + B(\mathbf{u},\mathbf{u})  = \mathbb P(\mathbf f)$$

where we have defined the Stokes operator $A$ and the bilinear form $B$ by

$$A \mathbf{u} = - \mathbb P(\Delta \mathbf{u}) \qquad B (\mathbf{u},\mathbf{v}) =  \mathbb P[ ( \mathbf{u}\cdot\nabla ) \mathbf{v}].$$

The pressure and the divergence free condition are "projected away". In general, we assume for simplicity that $\mathbf f$ is divergence free, so that ${\mathbb P}({\mathbf f}) = {\mathbf f}$; this can always be done, by adding the term $\mathbf f - \mathbb P(\mathbf f)$ to the pressure.
