= Vector potential =

Mathematical concept in vector calculus

In vector calculus, a vector potential is a vector field whose curl is a given vector field. This is analogous to a scalar potential, which is a scalar field whose gradient is a given vector field.

Formally, given a vector field $\mathbf{v}$, a vector potential is a $C^2$ vector field $\mathbf{A}$ such that
$$\mathbf{v} = \nabla \times \mathbf{A}.$$

== Consequence ==
If a vector field $\mathbf{v}$ admits a vector potential $\mathbf{A}$, then from the equality
$$\nabla \cdot (\nabla \times \mathbf{A}) = 0$$
(divergence of the curl is zero) one obtains
$$\nabla \cdot \mathbf{v} = \nabla \cdot (\nabla \times \mathbf{A}) = 0,$$
which implies that $\mathbf{v}$ must be a solenoidal vector field.

== Theorem ==
Let
$$\mathbf{v} : \R^3 \to \R^3$$
be a solenoidal vector field which is twice continuously differentiable. Assume that $\mathbf{v}(\mathbf{x})$ decreases at least as fast as $1/\|\mathbf{x}\|$ for $\| \mathbf{x}\| \to \infty$. Define
$$\mathbf{A} (\mathbf{x}) = \frac{1}{4 \pi}  \int_{\mathbb R^3} \frac{ \nabla_\mathbf{s} \times \mathbf{v} (\mathbf{s})}{\left\|\mathbf{x} -\mathbf{s} \right\|} \, d^3\mathbf{s}$$
where $\nabla_\mathbf{s} \times$ denotes curl with respect to variable $\mathbf{s}$. Then $\mathbf{A}$ is a vector potential for $\mathbf{v}$. That is,
$$\nabla \times \mathbf{A} =\mathbf{v}.$$

The integral domain can be restricted to any simply connected region $\Omega$. That is, $\mathbf{A'}$ also is a vector potential of $\mathbf{v}$, where
$$\mathbf{A'} (\mathbf{x}) = \frac{1}{4 \pi}  \int_{\Omega} \frac{ \nabla_\mathbf{s} \times \mathbf{v} (\mathbf{s})}{\left\|\mathbf{x} -\mathbf{s} \right\|} \, d^3\mathbf{s}.$$

A generalization of this theorem is the Helmholtz decomposition theorem, which states that any vector field can be decomposed as a sum of a solenoidal vector field and an irrotational vector field.

By analogy with the Biot–Savart law, $\mathbf{A''}(\mathbf{x})$ also qualifies as a vector potential for $\mathbf{v}$, where

$$\mathbf{A''}(\mathbf{x}) = \int_\Omega \frac{\mathbf{v}(\mathbf{s}) \times (\mathbf{x} - \mathbf{s})}{4 \pi \left|\mathbf{x} - \mathbf{s}\right|^3} d^3 \mathbf{s}$$

Substituting $\mathbf{j}$ (current density) for $\mathbf{v}$ and $\mathbf{H}$ (H-field) for $\mathbf{A}$, yields the Biot–Savart law.

Let $\Omega$ be a star domain centered at the point $\mathbf{p}$, where $\mathbf{p}\in \R^3$. Applying Poincaré's lemma for differential forms to vector fields, then $\mathbf{A'''}(\mathbf{x})$ also is a vector potential for $\mathbf{v}$, where

$$\mathbf{A'''}(\mathbf{x})
=\int_0^1 s \left[(\mathbf{x}-\mathbf{p})\times \mathbf{v}( s \mathbf{x} + (1{-}s) \mathbf{p})\right] ds$$

== Nonuniqueness ==
The vector potential admitted by a solenoidal field is not unique. If $\mathbf{A}$ is a vector potential for $\mathbf{v}$, then so is
$$\mathbf{A} + \nabla f,$$
where $f$ is any continuously differentiable scalar function. This follows from the fact that the curl of the gradient is zero.

This nonuniqueness leads to a degree of freedom in the formulation of electrodynamics, or gauge freedom, and requires choosing a gauge.

== See also ==
- Fundamental theorem of vector calculus
- Magnetic vector potential
- Solenoidal vector field
- Closed and Exact Differential Forms
