= Polar factorization theorem =

Theorem in Optimal Transport

In optimal transport, a branch of mathematics, polar factorization of vector fields is a basic result due to Brenier (1987), with antecedents of Knott-Smith (1984) and Rachev (1985), that generalizes many existing results among which are the polar decomposition of real matrices, and the rearrangement of real-valued functions.

== The theorem ==
Notation. Denote $\xi_\# \mu$ the image measure of $\mu$ through the map $\xi$.

Definition: Measure preserving map. Let $(X,\mu)$ and $(Y,\nu)$ be some probability spaces and $\sigma :X \rightarrow Y$ a measurable map. Then, $\sigma$ is said to be measure preserving iff $\sigma_{\#}\mu = \nu$, where $\#$ is the pushforward measure. Spelled out: for every $\nu$-measurable subset $\Omega$ of $Y$, $\sigma^{-1}(\Omega)$ is $\mu$-measurable, and $\mu(\sigma^{-1}(\Omega))=\nu(\Omega )$. The latter is equivalent to:

$$\int_{X}(f\circ \sigma)(x) \mu(dx) =\int_X (\sigma^*f)(x) \mu(dx) =\int_Y f(y) (\sigma_{\#}\mu)(dy) = \int_{Y}f(y) \nu(dy)$$

where $f$ is $\nu$-integrable and $f\circ \sigma$ is $\mu$-integrable.

Theorem. Consider a map $\xi :\Omega \rightarrow \mathbb{R}^{d}$ where $\Omega$ is a convex subset of $\mathbb{R}^{d}$, and $\mu$ a measure on $\Omega$ which is absolutely continuous. Assume that $\xi_{\#}\mu$ is absolutely continuous. Then there is a convex function $\varphi :\Omega \rightarrow \mathbb{R}$ and a map $\sigma :\Omega \rightarrow \Omega$ preserving $\mu$ such that

$\xi =\left( \nabla \varphi \right) \circ \sigma$

In addition, $\nabla \varphi$ and $\sigma$ are uniquely defined almost everywhere.

== Applications and connections ==
=== Dimension 1 ===
In dimension 1, and when $\mu$ is the Lebesgue measure over the unit interval, the result specializes to Ryff's theorem. When $d=1$ and $\mu$ is the uniform distribution over $\left[0,1\right]$, the polar decomposition boils down to

$\xi \left( t\right) =F_{X}^{-1}\left( \sigma \left( t\right) \right)$

where $F_{X}$ is cumulative distribution function of the random variable $\xi \left( U\right)$ and $U$ has a uniform distribution over $\left[ 0,1\right]$. $F_{X}$ is assumed to be continuous, and $\sigma \left( t\right)=F_{X}\left( \xi \left( t\right) \right)$ preserves the Lebesgue measure on $\left[ 0,1\right]$.

=== Polar decomposition of matrices ===
When $\xi$ is a linear map and $\mu$ is the Gaussian normal distribution, the result coincides with the polar decomposition of matrices. Assuming $\xi \left( x\right) =Mx$ where $M$ is an invertible $d\times d$ matrix and considering $\mu$ the $\mathcal{N}\left( 0,I_{d}\right)$ probability measure, the polar decomposition boils down to

$M=SO$

where $S$ is a symmetric positive definite matrix, and $O$ an orthogonal matrix. The connection with the polar factorization is $\varphi \left(x\right) =x^{\top }Sx/2$ which is convex, and $\sigma \left( x\right) =Ox$ which preserves the $\mathcal{N}\left( 0,I_{d}\right)$ measure.

=== Helmholtz decomposition ===
The results also allow to recover Helmholtz decomposition. Letting $x\rightarrow V\left( x\right)$ be a smooth vector field it can then be written in a unique way as

$V=w+\nabla p$

where $p$ is a smooth real function defined on $\Omega$, unique up to an additive constant, and $w$ is a smooth divergence free vector field, parallel to the boundary of $\Omega$.

The connection can be seen by assuming $\mu$ is the Lebesgue measure on a compact set $\Omega \subset R^{n}$ and by writing $\xi$ as a perturbation of the identity map

$\xi _{\epsilon }(x)=x+\epsilon V(x)$

where $\epsilon$ is small. The polar decomposition of $\xi _{\epsilon }$ is given by $\xi _{\epsilon }=(\nabla \varphi_{\epsilon })\circ \sigma_{\epsilon }$. Then, for any test function $f:R^{n}\rightarrow R$ the following holds:

$\int_{\Omega }f(x+\epsilon V(x))dx=\int_{\Omega }f((\nabla \varphi _{\epsilon })\circ \sigma _{\epsilon }\left( x\right) )dx=\int_{\Omega }f(\nabla \varphi _{\epsilon }\left( x\right) )dx$

where the fact that $\sigma _{\epsilon }$ was preserving the Lebesgue measure was used in the second equality.

In fact, as $\textstyle \varphi _{0}(x)=\frac{1}{2}\Vert x\Vert ^{2}$, one can expand $\textstyle \varphi _{\epsilon }(x)=\frac{1}{2}\Vert x\Vert ^{2}+\epsilon p(x)+O(\epsilon ^{2})$, and therefore $\textstyle \nabla \varphi_{\epsilon }\left( x\right) =x+\epsilon \nabla p(x)+O(\epsilon ^{2})$. As a result, $\textstyle \int_{\Omega }\left( V(x)-\nabla p(x)\right) \nabla f(x))dx$ for any smooth function $f$, which implies that $w\left( x\right) =V(x)-\nabla p(x)$ is divergence-free.

== See also ==
- Brenier's theorem
- polar decomposition – Type of matrix representation
