= Alfred Clebsch =

German mathematician (1833–1872)

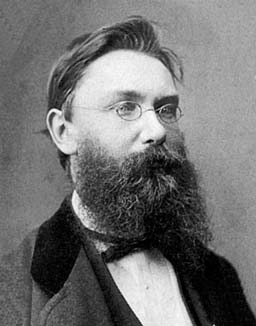
- Rudolf Friedrich Alfred Clebsch
- Born: 19 January 1833; Königsberg, Prussia
- Died: 7 November 1872 (aged 39); Göttingen, Prussia
- Education: University of Königsberg
- Known for: Clebsch graph Clebsch representation Clebsch surface Clebsch–Gordan coefficients Legendre–Clebsch condition
- Awards: Prix Poncelet (1868)
- Scientific career
- Fields: Mathematics
- Workplaces: University of Göttingen
- Thesis: De motu ellipsoidis in fluido incompressibili viribus quibuslibet impulsi
- Doctoral advisor: Franz Ernst Neumann
- Doctoral students: Alexander von Brill
- Other notable students: Gottlob Frege; Max Noether

Rudolf Friedrich Alfred Clebsch (19 January 1833 – 7 November 1872) was a German mathematician who made important contributions to algebraic geometry and invariant theory. He attended the University of Königsberg and was habilitated at Berlin. He subsequently taught in Berlin and Karlsruhe. His collaboration with Paul Gordan in Giessen led to the introduction of Clebsch–Gordan coefficients for spherical harmonics, which are now widely used in quantum mechanics.

Together with Carl Neumann at Göttingen, he founded the mathematical research journal Mathematische Annalen in 1868.

In 1883, Saint-Venant translated Clebsch's work on elasticity into French and published it as Théorie de l'élasticité des Corps Solides.

His wife was Dorothe Charlote Mathilde Heinel (1838-1866), Alfred and Dorothe Clebsch had four sons: Ernst Friedrich Alfred Clebsch (1859-1945); Arthur Friedrich Alfred Clebsch (1860-1931); Eduard Friedrich Alfred Clebsch (1861-1895), who became a medical doctor in Ems; and Alfred Friedrich Clebsch (1864-).

== Books ==
- Vorlesungen über Geometrie (Teubner, Leipzig, 1876-1891) edited by Ferdinand Lindemann.
- Théorie der binären algebraischen Formen (Teubner, 1872)
- Theorie der Abelschen Functionen with P. Gordan (B. G. Teubner, 1866)
- Theorie der Elasticität fester Körper (B. G. Teubner, 1862)

== See also ==
- Clebsch graph
- Clebsch representation
- Clebsch surface
- Eigenvalues and eigenvectors
- Helmholtz equation
- Hyperboloid model
- Pentagram map
- Quaternary cubic
