= Brenier's theorem =

Theorem in optimal transport

In optimal transport, Brenier's theorem is a theorem about the optimal solution to a transportation problem on Euclidean space. It states that the optimal transportation plan of an absolutely continuous probability measure is the gradient of a convex function. It is named after Yann Brenier.

More precisely, if $\mu$ and $\nu$ are probability measures on $\mathbb{R}^n$ with finite second moments and $\mu$ is absolutely continuous with respect to Lebesgue measure, then there is a unique optimal transport map $T$ pushing $\mu$ forward to $\nu$ for the cost $|x-y|^2$. This map has the form

$$T(x)=\nabla \varphi(x)$$

for a convex function $\varphi:\mathbb{R}^n\to (-\infty,+\infty]$, uniquely determined up to changes that do not affect its gradient on the support of $\mu$.

The theorem identifies convex gradients as the higher-dimensional analogue of increasing rearrangements on the real line. In one dimension, the optimal way to transport one probability distribution to another for quadratic cost is the monotone rearrangement. In higher dimensions there is no natural total ordering of points, and Brenier's theorem replaces monotonicity by cyclic monotonicity, which is characterized by gradients of convex functions.

Brenier's theorem is closely related to the polar factorization theorem, also due to Yann Brenier, which decomposes a suitable vector field as the composition of a measure-preserving map and the gradient of a convex function.

== Statement ==
Let $\mathcal{P}_2(\mathbb{R}^n)$ denote the set of Borel probability measures on $\mathbb{R}^n$ with finite second moment. If $\mu,\nu\in \mathcal{P}_2(\mathbb{R}^n)$, a measurable map $T:\mathbb{R}^n\to\mathbb{R}^n$ is said to push $\mu$ forward to $\nu$, written

$$T_{\#}\mu=\nu,$$

if

$$\nu(B)=\mu(T^{-1}(B))$$

for every Borel set $B\subseteq\mathbb{R}^n$. The Monge problem for the quadratic cost is to minimize

$$\int_{\mathbb{R}^n} |x-T(x)|^2\,d\mu(x)$$

among all measurable maps $T$ such that $T_{\#}\mu=\nu$.

One form of Brenier's theorem is the following.

Theorem. Let $\mu,\nu\in\mathcal{P}_2(\mathbb{R}^n)$, and suppose that $\mu$ is absolutely continuous with respect to the Lebesgue measure. Then there exists a convex function $\varphi:\mathbb{R}^n\to(-\infty,+\infty]$ such that

$$T=\nabla\varphi$$

pushes $\mu$ forward to $\nu$ and solves the quadratic Monge problem. The map $T$ is unique $\mu$-almost everywhere. Equivalently, the optimal transport plan for the corresponding Kantorovich problem is unique and is concentrated on the graph of $\nabla\varphi$.

The function $\varphi$ is called a Brenier potential, and the map $\nabla\varphi$ is called the Brenier map from $\mu$ to $\nu$.

== Inverse map ==
If both $\mu$ and $\nu$ are absolutely continuous, then the Brenier map from $\mu$ to $\nu$ has an inverse in the almost-everywhere sense. If

$$T=\nabla\varphi$$

is the Brenier map from $\mu$ to $\nu$, then the Brenier map from $\nu$ back to $\mu$ is given by

$$S=\nabla\varphi^*,$$

where $\varphi^*$ is the convex conjugate of $\varphi$. The maps satisfy

$S(T(x))=x$ for $\mu$-almost every $x$,

and

$T(S(y))=y$ for $\nu$-almost every $y$.
