= Scalar–vector–tensor decomposition =

In cosmological perturbation theory, the scalar–vector–tensor decomposition is a decomposition of the most general linearized perturbations of the Friedmann–Lemaître–Robertson–Walker metric into components according to their transformations under spatial rotations. It was first discovered by E. M. Lifshitz in 1946. It follows from Helmholtz's Theorem (see Helmholtz decomposition.) The general metric perturbation has ten degrees of freedom. The decomposition states that the evolution equations for the most general linearized perturbations of the Friedmann–Lemaître–Robertson–Walker metric can be decomposed into four scalars, two divergence-free spatial vector fields (that is, with a spatial index running from 1 to 3), and a traceless, symmetric spatial tensor field with vanishing doubly and singly longitudinal components. The vector and tensor fields each have two independent components, so this decomposition encodes all ten degrees of freedom in the general metric perturbation. Using gauge invariance four of these components (two scalars and a vector field) may be set to zero.

If the perturbed metric $g'_{\mu\nu} = g_{\mu\nu}+h_{\mu\nu}$ where $h_{\mu\nu}$ is the perturbation, then the decomposition is as follows,
$$h_{00}=-2\psi$$
$$h_{0i}=w_i$$
$$h_{ij}=2(\phi g_{ij}+S_{ij})$$
where the Latin indices i and j run over spatial components (1,...,3). The tensor field $S_{ij}$ is traceless under the spatial part of the background metric $g_{ij}$ (i.e. $g^{ij}S_{ij}=0$). The spatial vector $w_i$ and tensor $S_{ij}$ undergo further decomposition. The vector is written
$$w_i=w^{||}{}_i+w^{\perp}{}_i,$$
where $\nabla\times\mathbf{w}^{||}=\mathbf{0}$ and $\nabla\cdot\mathbf{w}^{\perp}=0$ ($\nabla_i$ is the covariant derivative defined with respect to the spatial metric $g_{ij}$). The notation is used because in Fourier space, these equations indicate that the vector points parallel and perpendicular to the direction of the wavevector, respectively. The parallel component can be expressed as the gradient of a scalar, $w^{||}{}_i=\nabla_iA$. Thus $\mathbf{w}$ can be written as a combination of a scalar and a divergenceless, two-component vector.

Finally, an analogous decomposition can be performed on the traceless tensor field $S_{ij}$. It can be written
$$S_{ij}=S^{||}{}_{ij}+S^{\perp}_{ij}+S^T{}_{ij},$$
where
$$S^{||}{}_{ij}=(\nabla_i\nabla_j-\frac{1}{3}g_{ij}\nabla^2)B,$$
where $B$ is a scalar (the combination of derivatives is set by the condition that $S$ be traceless), and
$$S^\perp{}_{ij} = \nabla_iS^\perp{}_j + \nabla_j S^\perp{}_i,$$
where $S^\perp{}_i$ is a divergenceless spatial vector. This leaves only two independent components of $S^T{}_{ij}$, corresponding to the two polarizations of gravitational waves. (Since the graviton is massless, the two polarizations are orthogonal to the direction of propagation, just like the photon.)

The advantage of this formulation is that the scalar, vector and tensor evolution equations are decoupled. In representation theory, this corresponds to decomposing perturbations under the group of spatial rotations. Two scalar components and one vector component can further be eliminated by gauge transformations. However, the vector components are generally ignored, as there are few known physical processes in which they can be generated. As indicated above, the tensor components correspond to gravitational waves. The tensor $S^T{}_{ij}$ is gauge invariant: it does not change under infinitesimal coordinate transformations.

== See also ==
- Helmholtz decomposition
- Ricci decomposition
