= Stokes operator =

The Stokes operator, named after George Gabriel Stokes, is an unbounded linear operator used in the theory of partial differential equations, specifically in the fields of fluid dynamics and electromagnetics.

== Definition ==
If we define $P_\sigma$ as the Leray projection onto divergence free vector fields, then the Stokes Operator $A$ is defined by

$$A:=-P_\sigma\Delta,$$

where $\Delta\equiv\nabla^2$ is the Laplacian. Since $A$ is unbounded, we must also give its domain of definition, which is defined as $\mathcal{D}(A)=H^2\cap V$, where $V=\{\vec{u}\in (H^1_0(\Omega))^n|\operatorname{div}\,\vec{u}=0\}$. Here, $\Omega$ is a bounded open set in $\mathbb{R}^n$ (usually n = 2 or 3), $H^2(\Omega)$ and $H^1_0(\Omega)$ are the standard Sobolev spaces, and the divergence of $\vec{u}$ is taken in the distribution sense.

== Properties ==
For a given domain $\Omega$ which is open, bounded, and has $C^2$ boundary, the Stokes operator $A$ is a self-adjoint positive-definite operator with respect to the $L^2$ inner product. It has an orthonormal basis of eigenfunctions $\{w_k\}_{k=1}^\infty$ corresponding to eigenvalues $\{\lambda_k\}_{k=1}^\infty$ which satisfy

$$0<\lambda_1<\lambda_2\leq\lambda_3\cdots\leq\lambda_k\leq\cdots$$

and $\lambda_k\rightarrow\infty$ as $k\rightarrow\infty$. Note that the smallest eigenvalue is unique and non-zero. These properties allow one to define powers of the Stokes operator. Let $\alpha>0$ be a real number. We define $A^\alpha$ by its action on $\vec{u}\in \mathcal{D}(A)$:

$$A^\alpha \vec{u}=\sum_{k=1}^\infty \lambda_k^{\alpha} u_k\vec{w_k}$$

where $u_k:=(\vec{u},\vec{w_k})$ and $(\cdot,\cdot)$ is the $L^2(\Omega)$ inner product.

The inverse $A^{-1}$ of the Stokes operator is a bounded, compact, self-adjoint operator in the space $H:=\{\vec{u}\in (L^2(\Omega))^n| \operatorname{div}\,\vec{u}=0 \text{ and }\gamma(\vec{u})=0\}$, where $\gamma$ is the trace operator. Furthermore, $A^{-1}:H\rightarrow V$ is injective.
