= Solenoidal vector field =

Vector field with zero divergence

An example of a solenoidal vector field, $\mathbf{v}(x, y) = (y, -x)$

In vector calculus and differential equations, a divergence free vector field is a vector field v with divergence zero at all points in the field:
$$\nabla \cdot \mathbf{v} = 0.$$
In electromagnetic theory, a divergence-free vector field is commonly called a solenoidal vector field, while in hydrodynamics it is commonly called an incompressible vector field, and in mathematical physics it is sometimes called a transverse vector field).

A common way of expressing this property is to say that the field has no sources or sinks, but one must be careful with this interpretation because there are vector fields without sources or sinks that still have non-zero divergence.

== Properties ==
The divergence theorem gives an equivalent integral definition of a solenoidal field; namely that for any closed surface, the net total flux through the surface must be zero:

$\;\; \mathbf{v} \cdot \, d\mathbf{S} = 0 ,$

where $d\mathbf{S}$ is the outward normal to each surface element.

The fundamental theorem of vector calculus states that any vector field can be expressed as the sum of an irrotational and a solenoidal field. The condition of zero divergence is satisfied whenever a vector field v has only a vector potential component, because the definition of the vector potential A as:
$$\mathbf{v} = \nabla \times \mathbf{A}$$
automatically results in the identity (as can be shown, for example, using Cartesian coordinates):
$$\nabla \cdot \mathbf{v} = \nabla \cdot (\nabla \times \mathbf{A}) = 0.$$
The converse also holds: for any solenoidal v there exists a vector potential A such that $\mathbf{v} = \nabla \times \mathbf{A}.$ (Strictly speaking, this holds subject to certain technical conditions on v, see Helmholtz decomposition.)

== Etymology ==
Solenoidal has its origin in the Greek word for solenoid, which is σωληνοειδές (sōlēnoeidés) meaning pipe-shaped, from σωλην (sōlēn) or pipe.

== Examples ==
- The magnetic field B (see Gauss's law for magnetism)
- The velocity field of an incompressible fluid flow
- The vorticity field
- The electric field E in neutral regions ($\rho_e = 0$);
- The current density J where the charge density is unvarying, $\frac{\partial \rho_e}{\partial t} = 0$.
- The magnetic vector potential A in Coulomb gauge

== See also ==
- Longitudinal and transverse vector fields
- Stream function
- Conservative vector field
