= Lemaître–Tolman metric =

Lorentzian metric describing an isotropic, expanding, nonhomogenous universe

In physics, the Lemaître–Tolman metric, also known as the Lemaître–Tolman–Bondi metric or the Tolman metric, is a Lorentzian metric based on an exact solution of Einstein's field equations; it describes an isotropic and expanding (or contracting) universe which is not homogeneous, and is thus used in cosmology as an alternative to the standard Friedmann–Lemaître–Robertson–Walker metric to model the expansion of the universe. It has also been used to model a universe which has a fractal distribution of matter to explain the accelerating expansion of the universe. It was first found by Georges Lemaître in 1933 and Richard Tolman in 1934 and later investigated by Hermann Bondi in 1947.

== Details ==
In a synchronous reference system where $g_{00}=1$ and $g_{0\alpha}=0$, the time coordinate $x^0=t$ (we set $G=c=1$) is also the proper time $\tau=\sqrt{g_{00}} x^0$ and clocks at all points can be synchronized. For a dust-like medium where the pressure is zero, dust particles move freely i.e., along the geodesics and thus the synchronous frame is also a comoving frame wherein the components of four velocity $u^i=dx^i/ds$ are $u^0=1,\,u^\alpha=0$. The solution of the field equations yield

$$ds^2 = d\tau^2 - e^{\lambda(\tau,R)} dR^2 - r^2(\tau,R) (d\theta^2 + \sin^2\theta d\phi^2)$$

where $r$ is the radius or luminosity distance in the sense that the surface area of a sphere with radius $r$ is $4\pi r^2$ and $R$ is just interpreted as the Lagrangian coordinate and

$$e^\lambda = \frac{r'^2}{1+f(R)}, \quad \left(\frac{\partial r}{\partial \tau}\right)^2 = f(R) + \frac{F(R)}{r}, \quad 4\pi r^2\rho = \frac{F'(R)}{2r'}$$

subjected to the conditions $1+f>0$ and $F>0$, where $f(R)$ and $F(R)$ are arbitrary functions, $\rho$ is the matter density and finally primes denote differentiation with respect to $R$. We can also assume $F'>0$ and $r'>0$ that excludes cases resulting in crossing of material particles during its motion. To each particle there corresponds a value of $R$, the function $r(\tau,R)$ and its time derivative respectively provides its law of motion and radial velocity. An interesting property of the solution described above is that when $f(R)$ and $F(R)$ are plotted as functions of $R$, the form of these functions plotted for the range $R\in [0,R_0]$ is independent of how these functions will be plotted for $R>R_0$. This prediction is evidently similar to the Newtonian theory. The total mass within the sphere $R=R_0$ is given by

$$m = 4\pi \int_0^{r(\tau,R_0)} \rho r^2 dr=4\pi \int_0^{R_0} \rho r' r^2 dR= \frac{F(R_0)}{2}$$

which implies that Schwarzschild radius is given by $r_s=2m=F(R_0)$.

The function $r(\tau,R)$ can be obtained upon integration and is given in a parametric form with a parameter $\eta$ with three possibilities,

$$f > 0:~~~~~~~~ r = \frac{F}{2f}(\cosh\eta-1), \quad \tau_0 -\tau = \frac{F}{2f^{3/2}}(\sinh\eta-\eta),$$
$$f < 0:~~~~~~~~ r = \frac{F}{-2f}(1-\cosh\eta), \quad \tau_0 -\tau = \frac{F}{2(-f)^{3/2}}(\eta-\sinh\eta)$$
$$f = 0:~~~~~~~~ r = \left(\frac{9F}{4}\right)^{1/3}(\tau_0-\tau)^{2/3}.$$

where $\tau_0(R)$ emerges as another arbitrary function. However, we know that centrally symmetric matter distribution can be described by at most two functions, namely their density distribution and the radial velocity of the matter. This means that of the three functions $f,F,\tau_0$, only two are independent. In fact, since no particular selection has been made for the Lagrangian coordinate $R$ yet that can be subjected to arbitrary transformation, we can see that only two functions are arbitrary. For the dust-like medium, there exists another solution where $r=r(\tau)$ and independent of $R$, although such solution does not correspond to collapse of a finite body of matter.

=== Schwarzschild solution ===
When $F=r_s=$const., $\rho=0$ and therefore the solution corresponds to empty space with a point mass located at the center. Further by setting $f=0$ and $\tau_0=R$, the solution reduces to Schwarzschild solution expressed in Lemaître coordinates.

=== Gravitational collapse ===
The gravitational collapse occurs when $\tau$ reaches $\tau_0(R)$ with $\tau_0'>0$. The moment $\tau=\tau_0(R)$ corresponds to the arrival of matter denoted by its Lagrangian coordinate $R$ to the center. In all three cases, as $\tau\rightarrow \tau_0(R)$, the asymptotic behaviors are given by

$$r \approx \left(\frac{9F}{4}\right)^{1/3}(\tau_0-\tau)^{2/3}, \quad e^{\lambda/2} \approx \left(\frac{2F}{3}\right)^{1/3} \frac{\tau_0'}{\sqrt{1+f}} (\tau_0-\tau)^{-1/3}, \quad 4\pi \rho \approx \frac{F'}{3F\tau_0'(\tau_0-\tau)}$$

in which the first two relations indicate that in the comoving frame, all radial distances tend to infinity and tangential distances approaches zero like $\tau-\tau_0$, whereas the third relation shows that the matter density increases like $1/(\tau_0-\tau).$ In the special case $\tau_0(R)=$constant where the time of collapse of all the material particle is the same, the asymptotic behaviors are different,

$$r \approx \left(\frac{9F}{3}\right)^{1/3}(\tau_0-\tau)^{2/3}, \quad e^{\lambda/2} \approx \left(\frac{2}{3}\right)^{1/3} \frac{F'}{2F^{2/3}\sqrt{1+f}} (\tau_0-\tau)^{2/3}, \quad 4\pi \rho \approx \frac{2}{3(\tau_0-\tau)^2}.$$

Here both the tangential and radial distances goes to zero like $(\tau_0-\tau)^{2/3}$, whereas the matter density increases like $1/(\tau_0-\tau)^2.$

== See also ==
- Lemaître coordinates
- Introduction to the mathematics of general relativity
- Stress–energy tensor
- Metric tensor (general relativity)
- Relativistic angular momentum
- inhomogeneous cosmology
