= Kruskal–Szekeres coordinates =

Coordinate system for the Schwarzschild geometry

Kruskal–Szekeres diagram, illustrated for 2GM = 1. The quadrants are the black hole interior (II), the white hole interior (IV) and the two exterior regions (I and III). The dotted 45° lines, which separate these four regions, are the event horizons. The darker hyperbolas which bound the top and bottom of the diagram are the physical singularities. The paler hyperbolas represent contours of the Schwarzschild r coordinate, and the straight lines through the origin represent contours of the Schwarzschild t coordinate.

In general relativity, Kruskal–Szekeres coordinates, named after Martin Kruskal and George Szekeres, are a coordinate system for the Schwarzschild geometry for a black hole. These coordinates have the advantage that they cover the entire spacetime manifold of the maximally extended Schwarzschild solution and are well-behaved everywhere outside the physical singularity. There is no coordinate singularity at the horizon.

The Kruskal–Szekeres coordinates also apply to spacetime around a spherical object, but in that case do not give a description of spacetime inside the radius of the object. Spacetime in a region where a star is collapsing into a black hole is approximated by the Kruskal–Szekeres coordinates (or by the Schwarzschild coordinates). The surface of the star remains outside the event horizon in the Schwarzschild coordinates, but crosses it in the Kruskal–Szekeres coordinates. (In any "black hole" which we observe, we see it at a time when its matter has not yet finished collapsing, so it is not really a black hole yet.) Similarly, objects falling into a black hole remain outside the event horizon in Schwarzschild coordinates, but cross it in Kruskal–Szekeres coordinates.

== Definition ==
Kruskal–Szekeres diagram. Each frame of the animation shows a blue hyperbola as the surface where the Schwarzschild radial coordinate is constant (and with a smaller value in each successive frame, until it ends at the singularities).

Kruskal–Szekeres coordinates on a black hole geometry are defined, from the Schwarzschild coordinates $(t,r,\theta,\phi)$, by replacing $t$ and $r$ by a new timelike coordinate $T$ and a new spacelike coordinate $X$:

$$T = \left(\frac{r}{2GM} - 1\right)^{1/2}e^{r/4GM}\sinh\left(\frac{t}{4GM}\right)$$
$$X = \left(\frac{r}{2GM} - 1\right)^{1/2}e^{r/4GM}\cosh\left(\frac{t}{4GM}\right)$$

for the exterior region $r>2GM$ outside the event horizon and:

$$T = \left(1 - \frac{r}{2GM}\right)^{1/2}e^{r/4GM}\cosh\left(\frac{t}{4GM}\right)$$
$$X = \left(1 - \frac{r}{2GM}\right)^{1/2}e^{r/4GM}\sinh\left(\frac{t}{4GM}\right)$$

for the interior region $0<r<2GM$. Here $GM$ is the gravitational constant multiplied by the Schwarzschild mass parameter, and this article is using units where $c = 1$.

It follows that on the union of the exterior region, the event horizon and the interior region the Schwarzschild radial coordinate $r$ (not to be confused with the Schwarzschild radius $r_\text{s} = 2GM$), is determined in terms of Kruskal–Szekeres coordinates as the (unique) solution of the equation:

$$T^2 - X^2 = \left(1-\frac{r}{2GM}\right)e^{r/2GM} \ , T^2 - X^2 < 1$$

Using the Lambert W function the solution is written as:

$$r = 2GM \left(1 + W_0\left( \frac{X^2 - T^2}{e} \right)\right) .$$

Moreover, one sees immediately that in the region external to the black hole $T^2 - X^2 < 0,\ X > 0$

$$t = 4GM \mathop{\mathrm{artanh}}(T/X)$$

whereas in the region internal to the black hole $0 < T^2 - X^2 < 1, \ T> 0$

$$t = 4GM \mathop{\mathrm{artanh}}(X/T)$$

In these new coordinates the metric of the Schwarzschild black hole manifold is given by:

$ds^2 = \frac{32G^3M^3}{r}e^{-r/2GM}(-dT^2 + dX^2) + r^2 d\Omega$

written using the (− + + +) metric signature convention and where the angular component of the metric (the Riemannian metric of the 2-sphere) is:

$$d\Omega\ \stackrel{\mathrm{def}}{=}\  d\theta^2+\sin^2\theta\,d\phi^2$$.

Expressing the metric in this form shows clearly that radial null geodesics i.e. with constant $\Omega = \Omega(\theta, \phi)$ are parallel to one of the lines $T = \pm X$. In the Schwarzschild coordinates, the Schwarzschild radius $r_\text{s} = 2GM$ is the radial coordinate of the event horizon $r = r_\text{s} = 2GM$. In the Kruskal–Szekeres coordinates the event horizon is given by $T^2 - X^2 = 0$. Note that the metric is perfectly well defined and non-singular at the event horizon. The curvature singularity is located at $T^2 - X^2 = 1$.

== Maximally extended Schwarzschild solution ==
The transformation between Schwarzschild coordinates and Kruskal–Szekeres coordinates defined for $r > 2GM$ and $-\infty<t<\infty$ can be extended, as an analytic function, at least to the first singularity which occurs at $T^2 - X^2 = 1$. Thus the above metric is a solution of Einstein's equations throughout this region. The allowed values are

$$-\infty < X < \infty$$
$$-\infty < T^2 - X^2 < 1$$

Note that this extension assumes that the solution is analytic everywhere.

In the maximally extended solution there are actually two singularities at $r = 0$, one for positive $T$ and one for negative $T$. The negative $T$ singularity is the time-reversed black hole, sometimes dubbed a "white hole". Particles can escape from a white hole but they can never return.

The maximally extended Schwarzschild geometry can be divided into 4 regions each of which can be covered by a suitable set of Schwarzschild coordinates. The Kruskal–Szekeres coordinates, on the other hand, cover the entire spacetime manifold. The four regions are separated by event horizons.

I	exterior region	$-X < T < +X$	$2GM < r$
II	interior black hole	$\vert X \vert < T < \sqrt{ 1 + X^2 }$	$0 < r < 2GM$
III	parallel exterior region	$+X < T < -X$	$2GM < r$
IV	interior white hole	$- \sqrt{ 1 + X^2 } < T < - \vert X \vert$	$0 < r < 2GM$

The transformation given above between Schwarzschild and Kruskal–Szekeres coordinates applies only in regions I and II (if we take the square root as positive). A similar transformation can be written down in the other two regions.

The Schwarzschild time coordinate $t$ is given by

$$\tanh\left(\frac{t}{4GM}\right) =
\begin{cases}T/X & \text{(in I and III)} \\
X/T & \text{(in II and IV)}\end{cases}$$

In each region it runs from $-\infty$ to $+\infty$ with the infinities at the event horizons.

Based on the requirements that the quantum process of Hawking radiation is unitary, 't Hooft proposed that the regions I and III, and II and IV are just mathematical artefacts coming from choosing branches for roots rather than parallel universes and that the equivalence relation

$$(T, X, \Omega) \sim (-T, -X, -\Omega)$$

should be imposed, where $-\Omega$ is the antipode of $\Omega$ on the 2-sphere. If we think of regions III and IV as having spherical coordinates but with a negative choice for the square root to compute $r$, then we just correspondingly use opposite points on the sphere to denote the same point in space, so e.g.

$$(t^\text{(I)}, r^\text{(I)}, \Omega^\text{(I)}) = (t, r, \Omega)  \sim (t^\text{(III)}, r^\text{(III)}, \Omega^\text{(III)}) = (t, -r, -\Omega).$$

This means that $r^\text{(I)}\Omega^\text{(I)} = r^\text{(III)}\Omega^\text{(III)} = r\Omega$. Since this is a free action by the group $\mathbb{Z}/2\mathbb{Z}$ preserving the metric, this gives a well-defined Lorentzian manifold (everywhere except at the singularity). It identifies the limit $t^\text{(II)} = -\infty$ of the interior region II corresponding to the coordinate line segment $T = -X ,\ T > 0, X < 0$ with the limit $t^\text{(I)} = -\infty$ of the exterior region I corresponding to $T = -X,\ T < 0, X > 0$. The identification does mean that whereas each pair $(T,X) \sim (-T, -X) \ne (0,0)$ corresponds to a sphere, the point $(T,X) = (0,0)$ (corresponding to the event horizon $r=2GM$ in the Schwarzschild picture) corresponds not to a sphere but to the projective plane $\R\mathbf{P}^2 = S^2/\pm$ instead, and the topology of the underlying manifold is no longer $\mathbb{R}^4 - \mathrm{line} = \mathbb{R}^2 \times S^2$. The manifold is no longer simply connected, because a loop (involving superluminal portions) going from a point in spacetime back to itself but at the opposite Kruskal–Szekeres coordinates cannot be contracted to a point.

== Qualitative features of the Kruskal–Szekeres diagram ==
Kruskal–Szekeres coordinates have a number of useful features which make them helpful for building intuitions about the Schwarzschild spacetime. Chief among these is the fact that all radial light-like geodesics (the world lines of light rays moving in a radial direction) look like straight lines at a 45-degree angle when drawn in a Kruskal–Szekeres diagram (this can be derived from the metric equation given above, which guarantees that if $dX = \plusmn dT$ then the proper time $ds = 0$). All timelike world lines of slower-than-light objects will at every point have a slope closer to the vertical time axis (the $T$ coordinate) than 45 degrees. So, a light cone drawn in a Kruskal–Szekeres diagram will look just the same as a light cone in a Minkowski diagram in special relativity.

The event horizons bounding the black hole and white hole interior regions are also a pair of straight lines at 45 degrees, reflecting the fact that a light ray emitted at the horizon in a radial direction (aimed outward in the case of the black hole, inward in the case of the white hole) would remain on the horizon forever. Thus the two black hole horizons coincide with the boundaries of the future light cone of an event at the center of the diagram (at $T = X = 0$), while the two white hole horizons coincide with the boundaries of the past light cone of this same event. Any event inside the black hole interior region will have a future light cone that remains in this region (such that any world line within the event's future light cone will eventually hit the black hole singularity, which appears as a hyperbola bounded by the two black hole horizons), and any event inside the white hole interior region will have a past light cone that remains in this region (such that any world line within this past light cone must have originated in the white hole singularity, a hyperbola bounded by the two white hole horizons). Note that although the horizon looks as though it is an outward expanding cone, the area of this surface, given by $r$ is just $16\pi M^2$, a constant. I.e., these coordinates can be deceptive if care is not exercised.

It may be instructive to consider what curves of constant Schwarzschild coordinate would look like when plotted on a Kruskal–Szekeres diagram. It turns out that curves of constant r-coordinate in Schwarzschild coordinates always look like hyperbolas bounded by a pair of event horizons at 45 degrees, while lines of constant t-coordinate in Schwarzschild coordinates always look like straight lines at various angles passing through the center of the diagram. The black hole event horizon bordering exterior region I would coincide with a Schwarzschild $t$-coordinate of $+\infty$ while the white hole event horizon bordering this region would coincide with a Schwarzschild $t$-coordinate of $-\infty$, reflecting the fact that in Schwarzschild coordinates an infalling particle takes an infinite coordinate time to reach the horizon (i.e. the particle's distance from the horizon approaches zero as the Schwarzschild $t$-coordinate approaches infinity), and a particle traveling up away from the horizon must have crossed it an infinite coordinate time in the past. This is just an artifact of how Schwarzschild coordinates are defined; a free-falling particle will only take a finite proper time (time as measured by its own clock) to pass between an outside observer and an event horizon, and if the particle's world line is drawn in the Kruskal–Szekeres diagram this will also only take a finite coordinate time in Kruskal–Szekeres coordinates.

The Schwarzschild coordinate system can only cover a single exterior region and a single interior region, such as regions I and II in the Kruskal–Szekeres diagram. The Kruskal–Szekeres coordinate system, on the other hand, can cover a "maximally extended" spacetime which includes the region covered by Schwarzschild coordinates. Here, "maximally extended" refers to the idea that the spacetime should not have any "edges": any geodesic path can be extended arbitrarily far in either direction unless it runs into a gravitational singularity. Technically, this means that a maximally extended spacetime is either "geodesically complete" (meaning any geodesic can be extended to arbitrarily large positive or negative values of its 'affine parameter', which in the case of a timelike geodesic could just be the proper time), or if any geodesics are incomplete, it can only be because they end at a singularity. In order to satisfy this requirement, it was found that in addition to the black hole interior region (region II) which particles enter when they fall through the event horizon from the exterior (region I), there has to be a separate white hole interior region (region IV) which allows us to extend the trajectories of particles which an outside observer sees rising up away from the event horizon, along with a separate exterior region (region III) which allows us to extend some possible particle trajectories in the two interior regions. There are actually multiple possible ways to extend the exterior Schwarzschild solution into a maximally extended spacetime, but the Kruskal–Szekeres extension is unique in that it is a maximal, analytic, simply connected vacuum solution in which all maximally extended geodesics are either complete or else the curvature scalar diverges along them in finite affine time.

== Lightcone variant ==
In the literature, the Kruskal–Szekeres coordinates sometimes also appear in their lightcone variant:

$$U = T - X$$
$$V = T + X,$$

in which the metric is given by

$$ds^{2} = -\frac{32G^3M^3}{r}e^{-r/2GM}(dU dV) + r^2 d\Omega^2,$$

and $r$ is defined implicitly by the equation

$$UV = \left(1-\frac{r}{2GM}\right)e^{r/2GM}.$$

These lightcone coordinates have the useful feature that radially outgoing null geodesics are given by $U = \text{constant}$, while radially ingoing null geodesics are given by $V = \text{constant}$. Furthermore, the (future and past) event horizon(s) are given by the equation $UV = 0$, and curvature singularity is given by the equation $UV = 1$.

The lightcone coordinates derive closely from Eddington–Finkelstein coordinates.

== See also ==
- Schwarzschild coordinates
- Lemaître coordinates
- Eddington–Finkelstein coordinates
- Isotropic coordinates
- Gullstrand–Painlevé coordinates
