= Metric tensor (general relativity) =

Tensor that describes the 4D geometry of spacetime

- $$\begin{pmatrix} g_{00} & g_{01} & g_{02} & g_{03} \\ g_{10} & g_{11} & g_{12} & g_{13} \\ g_{20} & g_{21} & g_{22} & g_{23} \\ g_{30} & g_{31} & g_{32} & g_{33} \\ \end{pmatrix}$$ Metric tensor of spacetime in general relativity written as a matrix

In general relativity, the metric tensor (in this context often abbreviated to simply the metric) is the fundamental object of study. The metric captures all the geometric and causal structure of spacetime, being used to define notions such as time, distance, volume, curvature, angle, and separation of the future and the past.

In general relativity, the metric tensor plays the role of the gravitational potential in the classical theory of gravitation, although the physical content of the associated equations is entirely different. Gutfreund and Renn say "that in general relativity the gravitational potential is represented by the metric tensor."

== Notation and conventions ==
This article works with a metric signature that is mostly positive (− + + +); see sign convention. The gravitation constant $G$ will be kept explicit. This article employs the Einstein summation convention, where repeated indices are automatically summed over.

== Definition ==
Mathematically, spacetime is represented by a four-dimensional differentiable manifold $M$ and the metric tensor is given as a covariant, second-degree, symmetric tensor on $M$, conventionally denoted by $g$. Moreover, the metric is required to be nondegenerate with signature (− + + +). A manifold $M$ equipped with such a metric is a type of Lorentzian manifold.

Explicitly, the metric tensor is a symmetric bilinear form on each tangent space of $M$ that varies in a smooth (or differentiable) manner from point to point. Given two tangent vectors $u$ and $v$ at a point $x$ in $M$, the metric can be evaluated on $u$ and $v$ to give a real number:
$$g_x(u,v) = g_x(v,u) \in \Reals.$$
This is a generalization of the dot product of ordinary Euclidean space. Unlike Euclidean space – where the dot product is positive definite – the metric is indefinite and gives each tangent space the structure of Minkowski space.

== Local coordinates and matrix representations ==
Physicists usually work in local coordinates (i.e. coordinates defined on some local patch of $M$). In local coordinates $x^\mu$ (where $\mu$ is an index that runs from 0 to 3) the metric can be written in the form
$$g = g_{\mu\nu} dx^\mu \otimes dx^\nu .$$
The factors $dx^\mu$ are one-form gradients of the scalar coordinate fields $x^\mu$. The metric is thus a linear combination of tensor products of one-form gradients of coordinates. The coefficients $g_{\mu\nu}$ are a set of 16 real-valued functions (since the tensor $g$ is a tensor field, which is defined at all points of a spacetime manifold). In order for the metric to be symmetric
$$g_{\mu\nu} = g_{\nu\mu} ,$$
giving 10 independent coefficients.

If the local coordinates are specified, or understood from context, the metric can be written as a 4 × 4 symmetric matrix with entries $g_{\mu\nu}$. The nondegeneracy of $g_{\mu \nu}$ means that this matrix is non-singular (i.e. has non-vanishing determinant), while the Lorentzian signature of $g$ implies that the matrix has one negative and three positive eigenvalues. Physicists often refer to this matrix or the coordinates $g_{\mu\nu}$ themselves as the metric (see, however, abstract index notation).

With the quantities $dx^\mu$ being regarded as the components of an infinitesimal coordinate displacement four-vector (not to be confused with the one-forms of the same notation above), the metric determines the invariant square of an infinitesimal line element, often referred to as an interval. The interval is often denoted
$$ds^2 = g_{\mu\nu} dx^\mu dx^\nu .$$

The interval $ds^2$ imparts information about the causal structure of spacetime. When $ds^2 < 0$, the interval is timelike and the square root of the absolute value of $ds^2$ is an incremental proper time. Only timelike intervals can be physically traversed by a massive object. When $ds^2 = 0$, the interval is lightlike, and can only be traversed by (massless) things that move at the speed of light. When $ds^2 > 0$, the interval is spacelike and the square root of $ds^2$ acts as an incremental proper length. Spacelike intervals cannot be traversed, since they connect events that are outside each other's light cones. Events can be causally related only if they are within each other's light cones.

The components of the metric depend on the choice of local coordinate system. Under a change of coordinates $x^\mu \to x^{\bar \mu}$, the metric components transform as
$$g_{\bar \mu \bar \nu} = \frac{\partial x^\rho}{\partial x^{\bar \mu}} \frac{\partial x^\sigma}{\partial x^{\bar \nu}} g_{\rho\sigma} = \Lambda^\rho {}_{\bar \mu} \, \Lambda^\sigma {}_{\bar \nu} \, g_{\rho \sigma} .$$

== Properties ==
The metric tensor plays a key role in index manipulation. In index notation, the coefficients $g_{\mu\nu}$ of the metric tensor $\mathbf{g}$ provide a link between covariant and contravariant components of other tensors. Contracting the contravariant index of a tensor with one of a covariant metric tensor coefficient has the effect of lowering the index
$$g_{\mu\nu}A^\nu = A_\mu$$
and similarly a contravariant metric coefficient raises the index
$$g^{\mu\nu}A_\nu = A^\mu.$$
Applying this property of raising and lowering indices to the metric tensor components themselves leads to the property
$$g_{\mu\nu}g^{\nu\lambda} = \delta^\lambda_\mu$$
For a diagonal metric (one for which coefficients $g_{\mu\nu}=0, \, \forall \mu\ne\nu$; i.e. the basis vectors are orthogonal to each other), this implies that a given covariant coefficient of the metric tensor is the inverse of the corresponding contravariant coefficient $g_{00} = (g^{00})^{-1}, g_{11}=(g^{11})^{-1}$, etc.

== Examples ==
=== Flat spacetime ===
The simplest example of a Lorentzian manifold is flat spacetime, which can be given as R^{4} with coordinates $(t,x,y,z)$ and the metric
$$ds^2 = -c^2 dt^2 + dx^2 + dy^2 + dz^2 = \eta_{\mu\nu} dx^{\mu} dx^{\nu}.$$
These coordinates actually cover all of R^{4}. The flat space metric (or Minkowski metric) is often denoted by the symbol η and is the metric used in special relativity. In the above coordinates, the matrix representation of η is
$$\eta = \begin{pmatrix}
-c^2 & 0 & 0 & 0 \\
0 & 1 & 0 & 0 \\
0 & 0 & 1 & 0 \\
0 & 0 & 0 & 1
\end{pmatrix}$$
(An alternative convention replaces coordinate $t$ by $ct$, and defines $\eta$ as in Minkowski space § Standard basis.)

In spherical coordinates $(t,r,\theta,\phi)$, the flat space metric takes the form
$$ds^2 = -c^2 dt^2 + dr^2 + r^2 d\Omega^2$$
where
$$d\Omega^2 = d\theta^2 + \sin^2\theta\,d\phi^2$$
is the standard metric on the 2-sphere.

=== Black hole metrics ===
The Schwarzschild metric describes an uncharged, non-rotating black hole. There are also metrics that describe rotating and charged black holes.

==== Schwarzschild metric ====
Besides the flat space metric the most important metric in general relativity is the Schwarzschild metric which can be given in one set of local coordinates by
$$ds^2 = -\left(1 - \frac{2GM}{rc^2} \right) c^2 dt^2 + \left(1 - \frac{2GM}{rc^2} \right)^{-1} dr^2 + r^2 d\Omega^2$$
where, again, $d\Omega^2$ is the standard metric on the 2-sphere. Here, $G$ is the gravitation constant and $M$ is a constant with the dimensions of mass. Its derivation can be found here. The Schwarzschild metric approaches the Minkowski metric as $M$ approaches zero (except at the origin where it is undefined). Similarly, when $r$ goes to infinity, the Schwarzschild metric approaches the Minkowski metric.

With coordinates
$$\left(x^0, x^1, x^2, x^3\right) = (ct, r, \theta, \varphi) \,,$$
the metric can be written as
$$g_{\mu\nu} = \begin{bmatrix}
-\left(1-\frac{2GM}{rc^2}\right) & 0 & 0 & 0 \\
0 & \left(1-\frac{2GM}{r c^2}\right)^{-1} & 0 & 0 \\
0 & 0 & r^2 & 0 \\
0 & 0 & 0 & r^2 \sin^2 \theta
\end{bmatrix}\,.$$

Several other systems of coordinates have been devised for the Schwarzschild metric: Eddington–Finkelstein coordinates, Gullstrand–Painlevé coordinates, Kruskal–Szekeres coordinates, and Lemaître coordinates.

==== Rotating and charged black holes ====
The Schwarzschild solution supposes an object that is not rotating in space and is not charged. To account for charge, the metric must satisfy the Einstein field equations like before, as well as Maxwell's equations in a curved spacetime. A charged, non-rotating mass is described by the Reissner–Nordström metric.

Rotating black holes are described by the Kerr metric (uncharged) and the Kerr–Newman metric (charged).

=== Other metrics ===
Other notable metrics are:

- Alcubierre metric,
- de Sitter/anti-de Sitter metrics,
- Friedmann–Lemaître–Robertson–Walker metric,
- Isotropic coordinates,
- Lemaître–Tolman metric,
- Peres metric,
- Rindler coordinates,
- Weyl–Lewis–Papapetrou coordinates,
- Gödel metric.

Some of them are without the event horizon or can be without the gravitational singularity.

== Volume ==
The metric g induces a natural volume form (up to a sign), which can be used to integrate over a region of a manifold. Given local coordinates $x^\mu$ for the manifold, the volume form can be written
$$\mathrm{vol}_g = \pm\sqrt{\left|\det (g_{\mu\nu})\right|}\,dx^0 \wedge dx^1 \wedge dx^2 \wedge dx^3$$
where $\det(g_{\mu\nu})$ is the determinant of the matrix of components of the metric tensor for the given coordinate system.

== Curvature ==
The metric $g$ completely determines the curvature of spacetime. According to the fundamental theorem of Riemannian geometry, there is a unique connection ∇ on any semi-Riemannian manifold that is compatible with the metric and torsion-free. This connection is called the Levi-Civita connection. The Christoffel symbols of this connection are given in terms of partial derivatives of the metric in local coordinates $x^\mu$ by the formula
$$\Gamma^\lambda {}_{\mu\nu}
= \frac 1 2 g^{\lambda\rho} \left( \frac{\partial g_{\rho\mu}}{\partial x^\nu} + \frac{\partial g_{\rho\nu}}{\partial x^\mu} - \frac{\partial g_{\mu\nu}}{\partial x^\rho} \right)
= \frac 1 2 g^{\lambda\rho} \left( g_{\rho\mu,\nu} + g_{\rho\nu,\mu} - g_{\mu\nu,\rho} \right)$$
(where commas indicate partial derivatives).

The curvature of spacetime is then given by the Riemann curvature tensor which is defined in terms of the Levi-Civita connection ∇. In local coordinates this tensor is given by:
$${R^\rho}_{\sigma\mu\nu} = \partial_\mu\Gamma^\rho {}_{\nu\sigma}
- \partial_\nu\Gamma^\rho {}_{\mu\sigma}
+ \Gamma^\rho {}_{\mu\lambda}\Gamma^\lambda {}_{\nu\sigma}
- \Gamma^\rho {}_{\nu\lambda}\Gamma^\lambda {}_{\mu\sigma}.$$

The curvature is then expressible purely in terms of the metric $g$ and its derivatives.

== Einstein's equations ==
One of the core ideas of general relativity is that the metric (and the associated geometry of spacetime) is determined by the matter and energy content of spacetime. Einstein's field equations:
$$R_{\mu\nu} - \frac{1}{2} R g_{\mu\nu} = \frac{8\pi G}{c^4} \,T_{\mu\nu}$$
where the Ricci curvature tensor
$$R_{\nu \rho} \ \stackrel{\mathrm{def}}{=}\ {R^{\mu}}_{\nu\mu \rho}$$
and the scalar curvature
$$R \ \stackrel{\mathrm{def}}{=}\ g^{\mu \nu}R_{\mu \nu}$$
relate the metric (and the associated curvature tensors) to the stress–energy tensor $T_{\mu\nu}$. This tensor equation is a complicated set of nonlinear partial differential equations for the metric components. Exact solutions of Einstein's field equations are very difficult to find.

== See also ==
- Alternatives to general relativity
- Introduction to the mathematics of general relativity
- Mathematics of general relativity
- Ricci calculus
