= Internal clock =

Internal clock may refer to:

- Circadian clock, a biochemical mechanism that oscillates with a period of 24 hours (in accordance with the day-night cycle); driver of the circadian rhythm
- de Broglie internal clock, hypothetical clock in an electron, constituting part of the mechanism by which a pilot wave guides a particle
- Electronic oscillator, an electronic circuit that produces a periodic, oscillating signal, often a sine wave or a square wave

== See also ==
- Clock rate, the frequency of an electronic oscillator (such as an oscillator crystal) used by computer processor
- Proper time, the elapsed time between two events as measured by a clock that passes through both events
