= Eddington–Finkelstein coordinates =

Coordinate system used in general relativity

Ingoing Eddington–Finkelstein coordinates in $(r,t')$ plane. Ingoing light-like paths are red, outgoing are blue. Light cones are shown in green for points above and below Schwarzschild radius $r_s$ (that marks the event horizon). Various possible 4-momenta (directions of where one can move in spacetime) are shown by arrows within the light cones.

In general relativity, Eddington–Finkelstein coordinates are a pair of coordinate systems for a Schwarzschild geometry (e.g. a spherically symmetric black hole) which are adapted to radial null geodesics. Null geodesics are the worldlines of photons; radial ones are those that are moving directly towards or away from the central mass. They are named for Arthur Stanley Eddington and David Finkelstein. Although they appear to have inspired the idea, neither ever wrote down these coordinates or the metric in these coordinates. Roger Penrose seems to have been the first to write down the null form but credits it to the above paper by Finkelstein, and, in his Adams Prize essay later that year, to Eddington and Finkelstein. Most influentially, Misner, Thorne and Wheeler, in their book Gravitation, refer to the null coordinates by that name.

In these coordinate systems, outward (inward) traveling radial light rays (which each follow a null geodesic) define the surfaces of constant "time", while the radial coordinate is the usual area coordinate so that the surfaces of rotation symmetry have an area of 4πr^{2}. One advantage of this coordinate system is that it shows that the apparent singularity at the Schwarzschild radius is only a coordinate singularity and is not a true physical singularity. While this fact was recognized by Finkelstein, it was not recognized (or at least not commented on) by Eddington, whose primary purpose was to compare and contrast the spherically symmetric solutions in Whitehead's theory of gravitation and Einstein's version of the theory of relativity.

== Schwarzschild metric ==
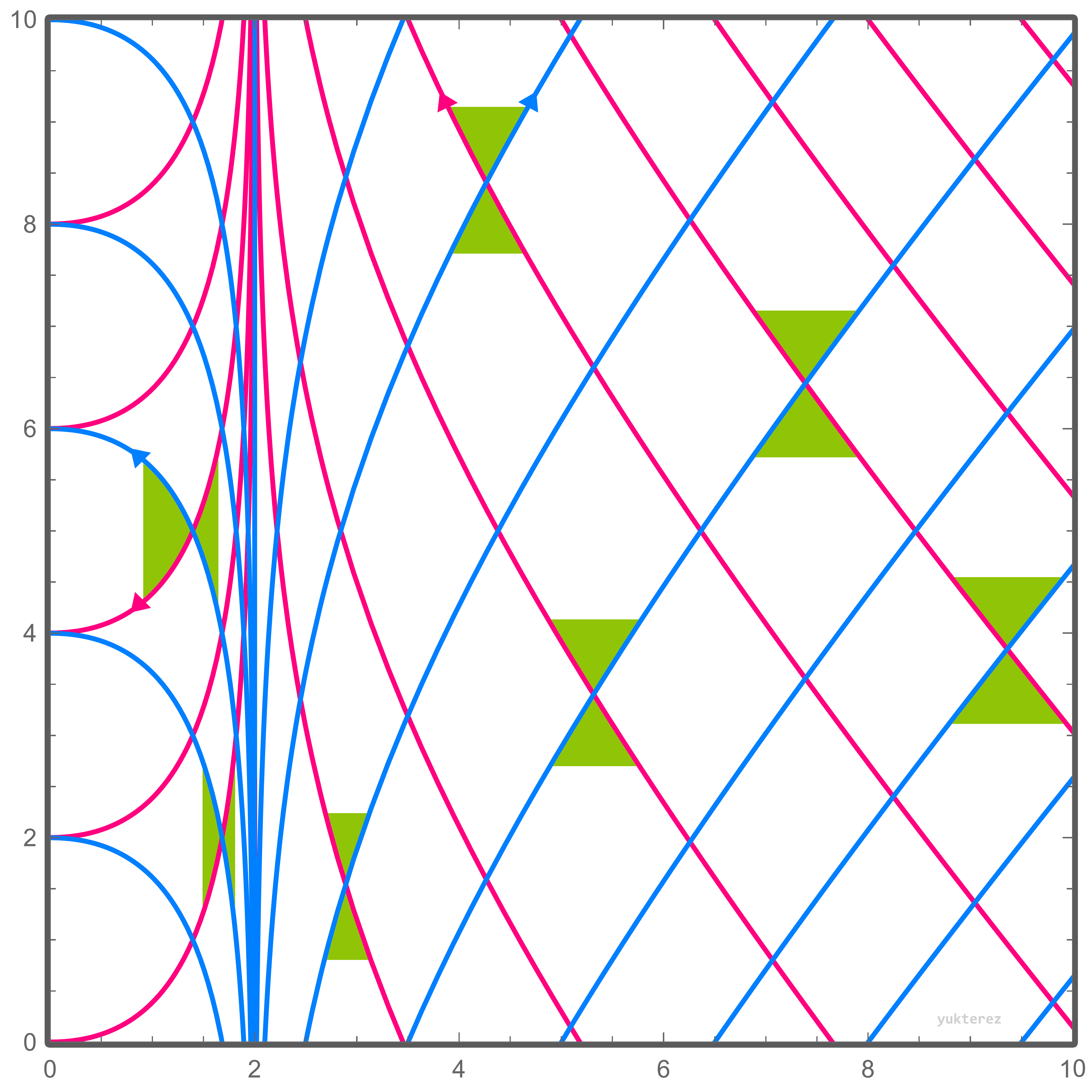
Schwarzschild solution in Schwarzschild coordinates, with two space dimensions suppressed, leaving just the time t and the distance from the center r. In red the incoming null geodesics. In blue outcoming null geodesics. In green the null light cones on which borders light moves, while massive objects move inside the cones.

The Schwarzschild coordinates are $(t,r,\theta,\varphi)$, and in these coordinates the Schwarzschild metric is well known:
$$ds^2  = \left(1-\frac{2GM}{r} \right) \, dt^2 - \left(1-\frac{2GM}{r}\right)^{ -1} \, dr^2- r^2 d\Omega^2$$
where
$$d\Omega^2\equiv d\theta^2+\sin^2\theta\,d\varphi^2.$$
is the standard Riemannian metric of the unit 2-sphere.

Note the conventions being used here are the metric signature of ( + − − − ) and the natural units where c = 1 is the dimensionless speed of light, G the gravitational constant, and M is the characteristic mass of the Schwarzschild geometry.

== Tortoise coordinate ==
Eddington–Finkelstein coordinates are founded upon the tortoise coordinate – a name that comes from one of Zeno of Elea's paradoxes on an imaginary footrace between "swift-footed" Achilles and a tortoise.

The tortoise coordinate $r^*$ is defined:
$$r^* = r + 2GM\ln\left| \frac{r}{2GM}-1 \right|.$$
so as to satisfy:
$$\frac{dr^*}{dr} = \left(1-\frac{2GM}{r}\right)^{-1}.$$

The tortoise coordinate $r^*$ approaches $-\infty$ as $r$ approaches the Schwarzschild radius $2GM$.

When some probe (such as a light ray or an observer) approaches a black hole event horizon, its Schwarzschild time coordinate grows infinite. The outgoing null rays in this coordinate system have an infinite change in t on travelling out from the horizon. The tortoise coordinate is intended to grow infinite at the appropriate rate such as to cancel out this singular behaviour in coordinate systems constructed from it.

The increase in the time coordinate to infinity as one approaches the event horizon is why information could never be received back from any probe that is sent through such an event horizon. This is despite the fact that the probe itself can nonetheless travel past the horizon. It is also why the space-time metric of the black hole, when expressed in Schwarzschild coordinates, becomes singular at the horizon – and thereby fails to be able to fully chart the trajectory of an infalling probe.

== Metric ==
The ingoing Eddington–Finkelstein coordinates are obtained by replacing the coordinate t with the new coordinate $v=t+r^*$. In these coordinates, the Schwarzschild metric can be written as

Metric in ingoing Eddington-Finkelstein coordinates

$$ds^2 = \left(1-\frac{2GM}{r} \right) dv^2 - 2 \, dv \, dr - r^2 d\Omega^2.$$

where again $d\Omega^2 = d\theta^2+\sin^2\theta \, d\varphi^2$ is the standard Riemannian metric on the unit radius 2-sphere.

Likewise, the outgoing Eddington–Finkelstein coordinates are obtained by replacing t with the null coordinate $u = t-r^*$. The metric is then given by:

Metric in outgoing Eddington-Finkelstein coordinates

$$ds^2 = \left(1-\frac{2GM}{r} \right) du^2 + 2 \, du \, dr - r^2 d\Omega^2.$$

In both these coordinate systems the metric is explicitly non-singular at the Schwarzschild radius (even though one component vanishes at this radius, the determinant of the metric is still non-vanishing and the inverse metric has no terms which diverge there.)

Note that for radial null rays, v=const or $v-2r^*$=const or equivalently $u+2r^*$=const or u=const we have dv/dr and du/dr approach 0 and ±2 at large r, not ±1 as one might expect if one regarded u or v as "time". When plotting Eddington–Finkelstein diagrams, surfaces of constant u or v are usually drawn as cones, with u or v constant lines drawn as sloping at 45 degree rather than as planes (see for instance Box 31.2 of MTW). Some sources instead take $t' = t \pm (r^* - r)\,$, corresponding to planar surfaces in such diagrams. In terms of this $t'$ the metric becomes
$$\begin{align}
ds^2 &=  \left( 1-\frac{2GM}{r} \right) dt'^2 \mp \frac{4GM}{r} \,dt' \,dr - \left( 1 + \frac{2GM}{r} \right) \,dr^2 - r^2 d\Omega^2 \\
&= \left(dt'^2 - dr^2 - r^2 d\Omega^2\right) - \frac{2GM}{r} \left(dt'\pm dr\right)^2
\end{align}$$
which is Minkowskian at large r. (This was the coordinate time and metric that both Eddington and Finkelstein presented in their papers.)

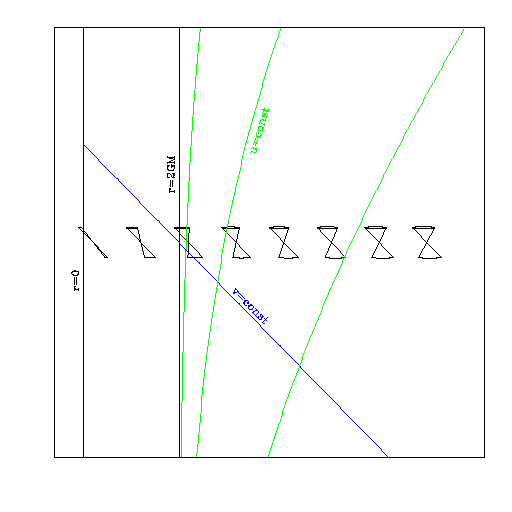
This is a plot of the light cones of the v-r coordinates where the r axis is an oblique straight line slanted up to the left. The blue line is an example of one of the v constant lines. Plotted are the light cones at various values of r. The green lines are various u constant lines. Note that they approach r=2GM assymptotically. In these coordinates, the horizon is the black hole horizon (nothing can come out). The diagram for u-r coordinates is the same diagram turned upside down and with u and v interchanged on the diagram. In that case the horizon is the white hole horizon, which matter and light can come out of, but nothing can go in.

The Eddington–Finkelstein coordinates are still incomplete and can be extended. For example, the outward traveling timelike geodesics defined by (with τ the proper time)
$$r(\tau)= \sqrt{2GM\tau}$$
$$\begin{align}
v(\tau) & = \int \frac{r(\tau)}{r(\tau)-2GM} \, d\tau \\
& = C+\tau +2\sqrt{2GM\tau} +4GM\ln\left(\sqrt{\frac{\tau}{2GM}}-1 \right)
\end{align}$$
has v(τ) → −∞ as τ → 2GM. I.e., this timelike geodesic has a finite proper length into the past where it comes out of the horizon (r = 2GM) when v becomes minus infinity. The regions for finite v and r < 2GM is a different region from finite u and r < 2GM. The horizon r = 2GM and finite v (the black hole horizon) is different from that with r = 2GM and finite u (the white hole horizon) .

The metric in Kruskal–Szekeres coordinates covers all of the extended Schwarzschild spacetime in a single coordinate system. Its chief disadvantage is that in those coordinates the metric depends on both the time and space coordinates. In Eddington–Finkelstein, as in Schwarzschild coordinates, the metric is independent of the "time" (either t in Schwarzschild, or u or v in the various Eddington–Finkelstein coordinates), but none of these cover the complete spacetime.

The Eddington–Finkelstein coordinates have some similarity to the Gullstrand–Painlevé coordinates in that both are time independent, and penetrate (are regular across) either the future (black hole) or the past (white hole) horizons. Both are not diagonal (the hypersurfaces of constant "time" are not orthogonal to the hypersurfaces of constant r.) The latter have a flat spatial metric, while the former's spatial ("time" constant) hypersurfaces are null and have the same metric as that of a null cone in Minkowski space ($t=\pm r$ in flat spacetime).

== See also ==
- Schwarzschild coordinates
- Kruskal–Szekeres coordinates
- Lemaître coordinates
- Gullstrand–Painlevé coordinates
- Vaidya metric
