= Gullstrand–Painlevé coordinates =

Coordinates suitable for following a free-falling observer in a Schwarzchild metric

Gullstrand–Painlevé coordinates are a particular set of coordinates for the Schwarzschild metric – a solution to the Einstein field equations which describes the gravitational field in the vicinity of a spherical mass with no electric charge or angular momentum. The ingoing coordinates are such that the time coordinate follows the proper time of a free-falling observer who starts from far away at zero velocity, and the spatial slices are flat. There is no coordinate singularity at the Schwarzschild radius (event horizon). The outgoing ones are simply the time reverse of ingoing coordinates (the time is the proper time along outgoing particles that reach infinity with zero velocity).

The solution was proposed independently by Paul Painlevé in 1921 and Allvar Gullstrand in 1922. It was not explicitly shown that these solutions were simply coordinate transformations of the usual Schwarzschild solution until 1933 in Georges Lemaître's paper, although Albert Einstein immediately believed that to be true.

== Derivation ==
The derivation of GP coordinates requires defining the following coordinate systems and understanding how data measured for events in one coordinate system is interpreted in another coordinate system.

Convention: The units for the variables are all geometrized. Time and mass have units in meters. The speed of light in flat spacetime has a value of 1. The gravitational constant has a value of 1. The metric is expressed in the +−−− sign convention.

=== Schwarzschild coordinates ===
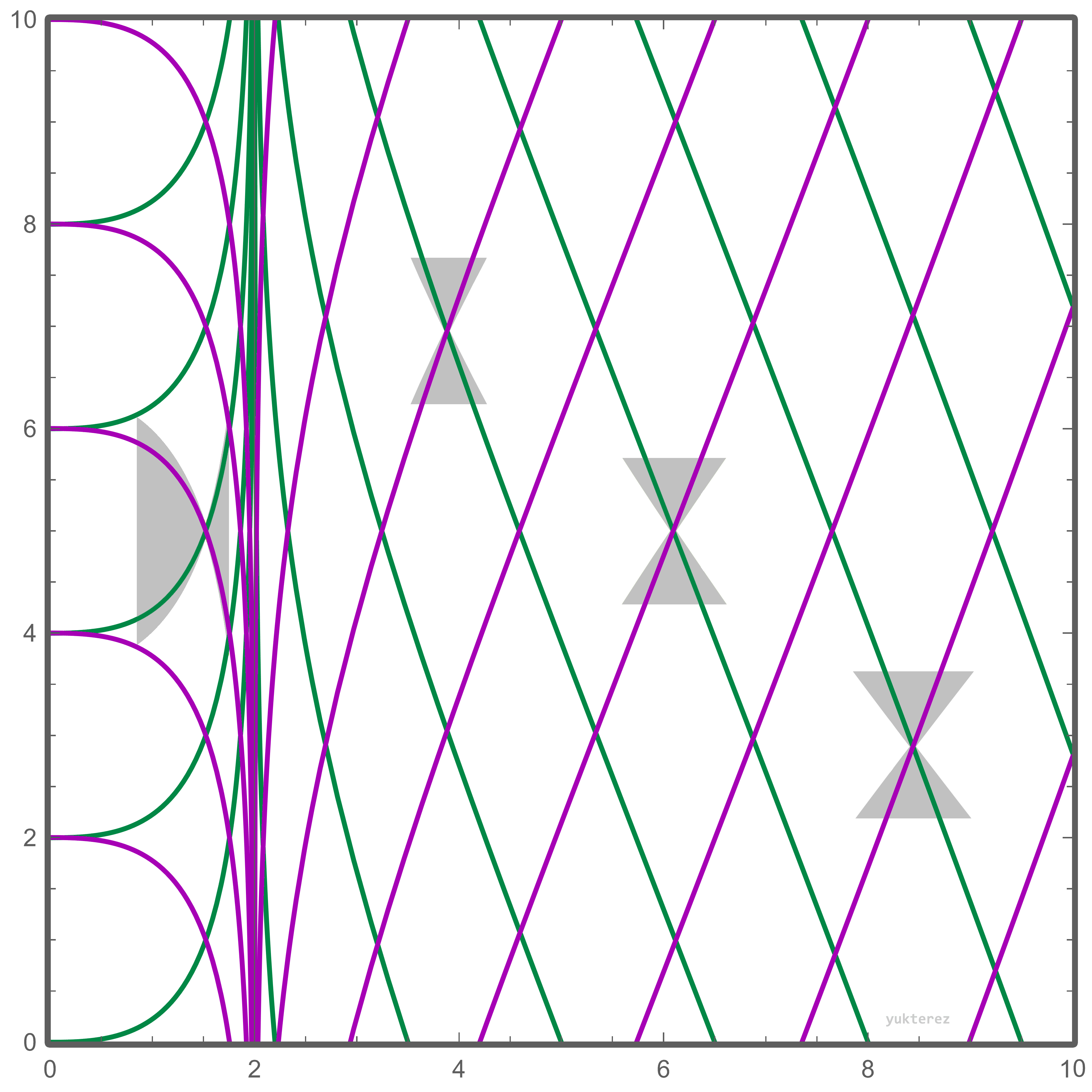
Free falling worldlines in classic Schwarzschild-Droste coordinates

A Schwarzschild observer is a far observer or a bookkeeper. He does not directly make measurements of events that occur in different places. Instead, he is far away from the black hole and the events. Observers local to the events are enlisted to make measurements and send the results to him. The bookkeeper gathers and combines the reports from various places. The numbers in the reports are translated into data in Schwarzschild coordinates, which provide a systematic means of evaluating and describing the events globally. Thus, the physicist can compare and interpret the data intelligently. He can find meaningful information from these data. The Schwarzschild form of the Schwarzschild metric using Schwarzschild coordinates is given by

$$g = \left(1-\frac{2M}{r} \right) \, dt^2 -\frac{dr^2}{ \left(1-\frac{2M}{r} \right)}- r^2 \, d\theta^2-r^2\sin^2\theta \, d\phi^2\,$$

where

G=1=c
t, r, θ, φ are the Schwarzschild coordinates,
M is the mass of the black hole.

=== GP coordinates ===
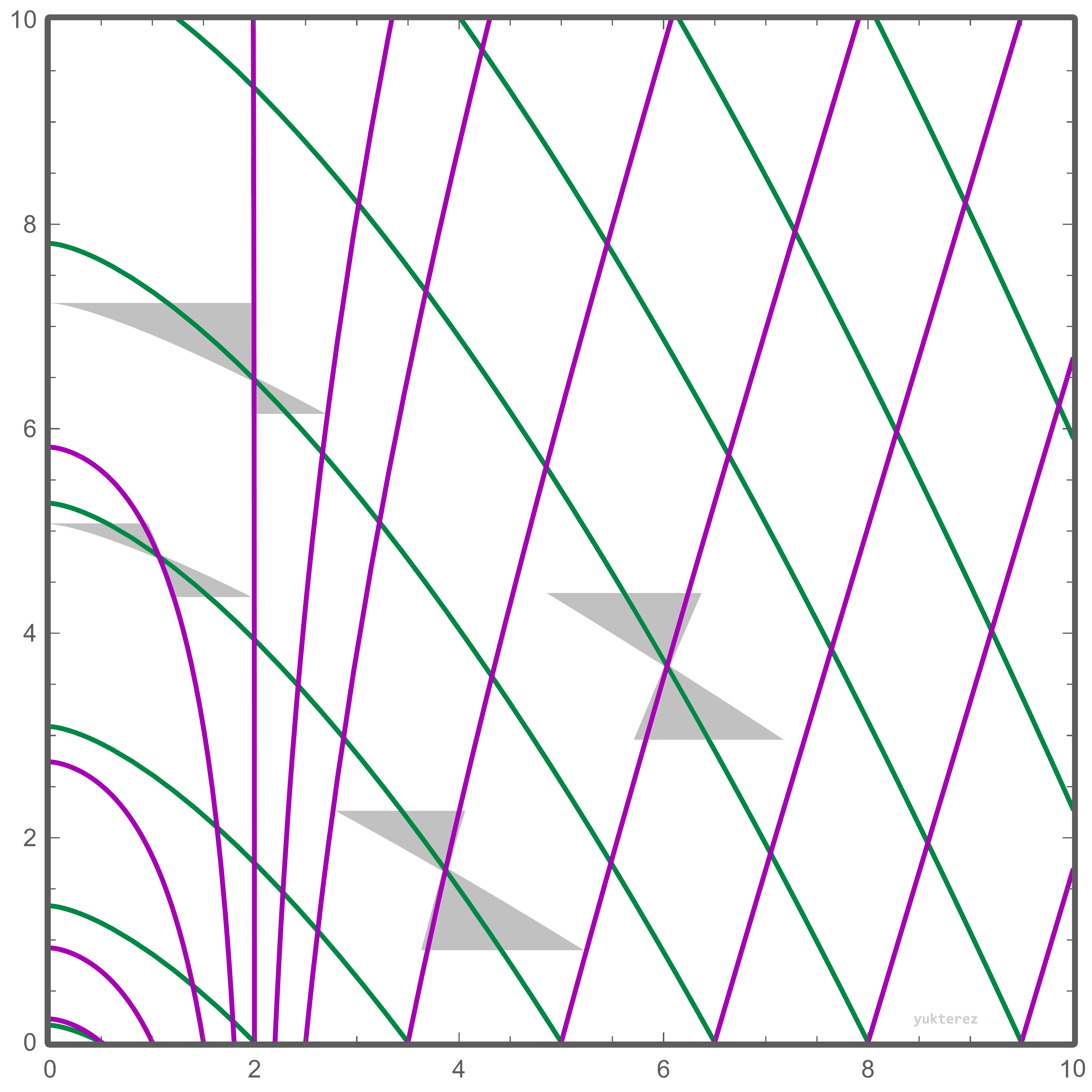
Free falling worldlines in Gullstrand–Painlevé raindrop coordinates

Define a new time coordinate by

$$t_r= t+a(r)$$

for some arbitrary function $a(r)$. Substituting in the Schwarzschild metric one gets

$$g = \left(1-\frac{2M}{r} \right)\, dt_r^2 - 2 \left(1-\frac{2M}{r} \right)\,a' dt_r dr - \left( {\frac{1}{1-\frac{2M}{r} }}-\left(1-\frac{2M}{r} \right)\,{a'}^2\right) dr^2 -r^2 \, d\theta^2-r^2\sin^2\theta \, d\phi^2\,$$

where $a'(r)= {\frac {da}{dr}}$. If we now choose $a(r)$ such that the term multiplying $dr^2$ is unity, we get

$$a'={\frac{1}{1- {\frac{2M}{r}}}}\sqrt{\frac{2M}{r}}$$

and the metric becomes

$$g = \left(1-\frac{2M}{r} \right)\, dt_r^2- 2\sqrt{\frac{2M}{r}} dt_r dr - dr^2-r^2 \, d\theta^2-r^2\sin^2\theta \, d\phi^2\,$$

The spatial metric (i.e. the restriction of the metric $g|_{t = t_r}$ on the surface where $t_r$ is constant) is simply the flat metric expressed in spherical polar coordinates. This metric is regular along the horizon where r=2M, since, although the temporal term goes to zero, the off-diagonal term in the metric is still non-zero and ensures that the metric is still invertible (the determinant of the metric is $-r^4 \sin(\theta)^2$).

The function $a(r)$ is given by

$$a(r)= \int {\frac{\sqrt{\frac {2M}{r}}}{ 1-{\frac{2M}{r}}}} dr = 2M\left(2y+\ln \left({\frac{y-1}{y+1}}\right)\right)$$

where $y=\sqrt{\frac{r}{2M}}$. The function $a(r)$ is clearly singular at r=2M as it must be to remove that singularity in the Schwarzschild metric.

Other choices for $a(r)$ lead to other coordinate charts for the Schwarzschild vacuum; a general treatment is given in Francis & Kosowsky.

== Motion of raindrop ==
Define a raindrop as an object which plunges radially toward a black hole from rest at infinity.

In Schwarzschild coordinates, the velocity of a raindrop is given by

$$\frac{dr}{dt}=-\left(1-\frac{2M}{r} \right) \sqrt{\frac{2M}{r}}.\,$$

- The speed tends to 0 as r approaches the event horizon. The raindrop appears to have slowed as it gets nearer the event horizon and halted at the event horizon as measured by the bookkeeper. Indeed, an observer outside the event horizon would see the raindrop plunge slower and slower. Its image infinitely redshifts and never makes it through the event horizon. However, the bookkeeper does not physically measure the speed directly. He translates data relayed by the shell observer into Schwarzschild values and computes the speed. The result is only an accounting entry.

In GP coordinates, the velocity is given by

$$\frac{dr}{dt_r}=-\beta = -\sqrt{\frac{2M}{r}}. \,$$

- The speed of the raindrop is inversely proportional to the square root of the radius and equals the negative newtonian escape velocity. At points very far away from the black hole, the speed is extremely small. As the raindrop plunges toward the black hole, the speed increases. At the event horizon, the speed has the value 1. There is no discontinuity or singularity at the event horizon.
- Inside the event horizon, $r < 2M\,\!$ the speed increases as the raindrop gets closer to the singularity. Eventually, the speed becomes infinite at the singularity. As shown below the speed is always less than the speed of light. The results may not be correctly predicted by the equation at and very near the singularity since the true solution may be quite different when quantum mechanics is incorporated.
- Despite the problem with the singularity, it's still possible to compute the travel time for the raindrop from the horizon to the center of black hole mathematically.

Integrate the equation of motion:

$\int_0^{T_r}\,t_r = -\int_{2M}^0 \left ( \sqrt{\frac{2M}{r}} \right )^{-1}\,dr. \,$ The result is $T_r=\frac{4}{3} M. \,$

Using this result for the speed of the raindrop we can find the proper time along the trajectory of the raindrop in terms of the time $t_r$. We have

$$d\tau^2 = g|_{\text{trajectory}} = dt_r^2 \left[ 1-{\frac {2M}{r}} + 2\sqrt{\frac{2M}{r}} {\sqrt{\frac{2M}{r}}} -{\sqrt{\frac{2M}{r}}}^2\right]=dt_r^2$$

I.e. along the rain drops trajectory, the elapse of time $t_r$ is exactly the proper time along the trajectory. One could have defined the GP coordinates by this requirement, rather than by demanding that the spatial surfaces be flat.

A closely related set of coordinates is the Lemaître coordinates, in which the "radial" coordinate is chosen to be constant along the paths of the raindrops. Since r changes as the raindrops fall, this metric is time dependent while the GP metric is time independent.

The metric obtained if, in the above, we take the function f(r) to be the negative of what we choose above is also called the GP coordinate system. The only change in the metric is that cross term changes sign. This metric is regular for outgoing raindrops—i.e. particles which leave the black hole travelling outward with just escape velocity so that their speed at infinity is zero. In the usual GP coordinates, such particles cannot be described for r<2M. They have a zero value for $\frac{dr}{dt_r}$ at r=2M. This is an indication that the Schwarzschild black hole has two horizons, a past horizon, and a future horizon. The Original form of the GP coordinates is regular across the future horizon (where particles fall into when they fall into a black hole) while the alternative negative version is regular across the past horizon (from which particles come out of the black hole if they do so).

The Kruskal–Szekeres coordinates are regular across both horizons at the expense of making the metric strongly dependent on the time coordinate.

== Speeds of light ==
Assume radial motion. For light, $d\tau =0.$ Therefore,

$$0 = \left (dr+\left ( 1+\sqrt{\frac{2M}{r}}\ \right ) dt_r \right)\left (dr-\left (1-\sqrt{\frac{2M}{r}}\ \right ) \, dt_r\right ),$$

$$\frac{dr}{dt_r}=\plusmn 1-\sqrt{\frac{2M}{r}}.$$

- At places very far away from the black hole, $r \to \infty, \tfrac{dr}{dt_r}=\pm 1.$ The speed of light is 1, the same as in special relativity.
- At the event horizon, $r=2M,$ the speed of light shining outward away from the center of black hole is $\tfrac{dr}{dt_r}=0.$ It can not escape from the event horizon. Instead, it gets stuck at the event horizon. Since light moves faster than all others, matter can only move inward at the event horizon. Everything inside the event horizon is hidden from the outside world.
- Inside the event horizon, $r<2M,$ the rain observer measures that the light moves toward the center with speed greater than 2. This is plausible. Even in special relativity, the proper speed of a moving object is
  $$\frac{dr_{ff}}{d\tau}=\frac{v}{\sqrt{1-v^2}} \ge 1.$$

There are two important points to consider:

1. No object should have speed greater than the speed of light as measured in the same reference frame. Thus, the principle of causality is preserved. Indeed, the speed of raindrop is less than that of light:$\frac{\left ( \dfrac{dr}{dt_r}\right )_\text{raindrop}} {\left ( \dfrac{dr}{dt_r} \right)_\text{light}}= \frac{\sqrt{\dfrac{2M}{r}}} {1+\sqrt{\dfrac{2M}{r}}} < 1.$
2. The time of travel for light shining inward from event horizon to the center of black hole can be obtained by integrating the equation for the velocity of light,

$$\int_0^{T_r}\,dt=-\int_{2M}^{0} \left ( \sqrt{\frac{2M}{r}}+1 \right )^{-1}\,dr.$$

The result is $T_r=4M\ln 2 -2M \approx 0.77M.$

1. The light travel time for a stellar black hole with a typical size of 3 solar masses is about 11 microseconds.
2. Ignoring effects of rotation, for Sagittarius A*, the supermassive black hole residing at the center of the Milky Way, with mass of 3.7 million solar masses, the light travel time is about 14 seconds.
3. The supermassive black hole at the center of Messier 87, a giant elliptical galaxy in the Virgo Cluster, is one of the largest known supermassive black holes. With a mass of 3 billion solar masses, it takes about 3 hours for light to travel to the central singularity and 5 hours for a raindrop.

== A rain observer's view of the universe ==
How does the universe look like as seen by a rain observer plunging into the black hole? The view can be described by the following equations:

$$\cos \boldsymbol{\Phi}_r =\frac{dr_r}{dt_r} = \frac{ \sqrt{\dfrac{2M}{r}}+ \cos \boldsymbol{\Phi}_s }  {1+ \sqrt{\dfrac{2M}{r}}\ \cos \boldsymbol{\Phi}_s },\,$$
$$\cos \boldsymbol{\Phi}_s = \frac{dr_s}{dt_s} =\pm \sqrt{1-\left(1-\frac{2M}{r}\right)\frac{\mathit{I}^2}{r^2}},\,\!$$
$$\phi=\mathit{I}\int_{r_0}^{\infty}\frac{dr}{r^2 \  \cos \boldsymbol{\Phi}_s},\,\!$$

where

$\boldsymbol{\Phi}_r, \ \boldsymbol{\Phi}_s\,\!$ are the rain observer's and shell observer's viewing angles with respect to the radially outward direction.
$\ \phi\,\!$ is the angle between the distant star and the radially outward direction.
$\mathit{I}\,\!$ is the impact parameter. Each incoming light ray can be backtraced to a corresponding ray at infinity. The Impact parameter for the incoming light ray is the distance between the corresponding ray at infinity and a ray parallel to it that plunges directly into the black hole.

Because of spherical symmetry, the trajectory of light always lies in a plane passing through the center of sphere. It's possible to simplify the metric by assuming $\theta = \frac{\pi}{2}\,\!$ .

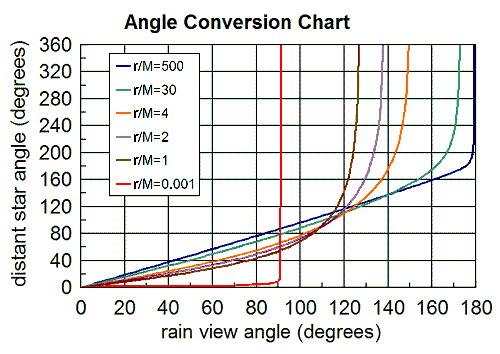

The impact parameter $\mathit{I}\,\!$ can be computed knowing the rain observer's r-coordinate $r_0\,\!$ and viewing angle $\ \boldsymbol{\Phi}_{r0}\,\!$ . Then, the actual angle $\ \phi\,\!$ of the distant star, is determined by numerically integrating $dr\,\!$ from $r_0\,\!$ to infinity. A chart of the sample results is shown at right.

- At r/M = 500, the black hole is still very far away. It subtends a diametrical angle of ~ 1 degree in the sky. The stars are not distorted much by the presence of the black hole, except for the stars directly behind it. Due to gravitational lensing, these obstructed stars are now deflected 5 degrees away from the back. In between these stars and the black hole is a circular band of secondary images of the stars. The duplicate images are instrumental in the identification of the black hole.
- At r/M = 30, the black hole has become much bigger, spanning a diametrical angle of ~15 degrees in the sky. The band of secondary images has also grown to 10 degrees. It's now possible to find faint tertiary images in the band, which are produced by the light rays that have looped around the black hole once already. The primary images are distributed more tightly in the rest of the sky. The pattern of distribution is similar to that previously exhibited.
- At r/M = 2, the event horizon, the black hole now occupies a substantial portion of the sky. The rain observer would see an area up to 42 degrees from the radially inward direction that is pitch dark. The band of secondary and tertiary images, rather than increasing, has decreased in size to 5 degrees. The aberration effect is now quite dominant. The speed of plunging has reached the light speed. The distribution pattern of primary images is changing drastically. The primary images are shifting toward the boundary of the band. The edge near the band is now crowded with stars. Due to Doppler effect, the primary image of the stars which were originally located behind the rain observer have their images appreciably red-shifted, while those that were in front are blue-shifted and appear very bright.
- At r/M=0.001, the curve of distant star angle versus view angle appears to form a right angle at the 90 degrees view angle. Almost all of the star images are congregated in a narrow ring 90 degrees from the radially inward direction. Between the ring and the radially inward direction is the enormous black hole. On the opposite side, only a few stars shine faintly.
- As the rain observer approaches the singularity, $r \rightarrow 0\,\!$, and $\cos \boldsymbol{\Phi}_r \rightarrow \sqrt{\frac{r}{2M}}\,\!$ . Most of the stars and their images caused by multiple orbits of the light around the black hole are squeezed to a narrow band at the 90° viewing angle. The observer sees a magnificent bright ring of stars bisecting the dark sky.

== History ==
Although the publication of Gullstrand's paper came after Painlevé's, Gullstrand's paper was dated 25 May 1921, whereas Painlevé's publication was a writeup of his presentation before the French Academy of Sciences in Paris on 24 October 1921. In this way, Gullstrand's work appears to have priority.

Both Painlevé and Gullstrand used this solution to argue that Einstein's theory was incomplete in that it gave multiple solutions for the gravitational field of a spherical body, and moreover gave different physics (they argued that the lengths of rods could sometimes be longer and sometimes shorter in the radial than the tangential directions). The trick of the Painlevé proposal was that he no longer stuck to a full quadratic (static) form but instead, allowed a cross time-space product making the metric form no longer static but stationary and no longer direction symmetric but preferentially oriented.

In a second, longer paper (November 14, 1921), Painlevé explains how he derived his solution by directly solving Einstein's equations for a generic spherically symmetric form of the metric. The result, equation (4) of his paper, depended on two arbitrary functions of the r coordinate yielding a double infinity of solutions. We now know that these simply represent a variety of choices of both the time and radial coordinates.

Painlevé wrote to Einstein to introduce his solution and invited Einstein to Paris for a debate. In Einstein's reply letter (December 7), he apologized for not being in a position to visit soon and explained why he was not pleased with Painlevé's arguments, emphasising that the coordinates themselves have no meaning. Finally, Einstein came to Paris in early April. On the 5th of April 1922, in a debate at the Collège de France with Painlevé, Jean Becquerel, Marcel Brillouin, Élie Cartan, Théophile de Donder, Jacques Hadamard, Paul Langevin and Charles Nordmann on "the infinite potentials", Einstein, baffled by the non quadratic cross term in the line element, rejected the Painlevé solution.

== See also ==
- Isotropic coordinates
- Eddington–Finkelstein coordinates
- Kruskal–Szekeres coordinates
- Lemaître coordinates
