= Synchronous frame =

Reference frame

A synchronous frame is a reference frame in which the time coordinate defines proper time for all co-moving observers. It is built by choosing some constant time hypersurface as an origin, such that has in every point a normal along the time line and a light cone with an apex in that point can be constructed; all interval elements on this hypersurface are space-like. A family of geodesics normal to this hypersurface are drawn and defined as the time coordinates with a beginning at the hypersurface. In terms of metric-tensor components $g_{ik}$, a synchronous frame is defined such that

$$g_{00}=1,\quad g_{0\alpha}=0$$

where $\alpha=1,2,3.$ Such a construct, and hence, choice of synchronous frame, is always possible though it is not unique. It allows any transformation of space coordinates that does not depend on time and, additionally, a transformation brought about by the arbitrary choice of hypersurface used for this geometric construct.

== Synchronization in an arbitrary frame of reference ==
Synchronization of clocks located at different space points means that events happening at different places can be measured as simultaneous if those clocks show the same times. In special relativity, the space distance element dl is defined as the intervals between two very close events that occur at the same moment of time. In general relativity this cannot be done, that is, one cannot define dl by just substituting dt ≡ dx^{0} = 0 in the metric. The reason for this is the different dependence between proper time $\tau$ and time coordinate x^{0} ≡ t in different points of space., i.e., $cd\tau = \sqrt{g_{00}}dx^0.$

Figure 1. Synchronization of clocks in curved space through light signals.

To find dl in this case, time can be synchronized over two infinitesimally neighboring points in the following way (Fig. 1): Bob sends a light signal from some space point B with coordinates $x^{\alpha} + dx^{\alpha}$ to Alice who is at a very close point A with coordinates x^{α} and then Alice immediately reflects the signal back to Bob. The time necessary for this operation (measured by Bob), multiplied by c is, obviously, the doubled distance between Alice and Bob.

The line element, with separated space and time coordinates, is:

| $ds^2 = g_{\alpha\beta}\, dx^\alpha\, dx^\beta + 2g_{0\alpha}\, dx^0\, dx^\alpha + g_{00} \left ( dx^0 \right )^2,$ | eq. 1 |

where a repeated Greek index within a term means summation by values 1, 2, 3. The interval between the events of signal arrival and its immediate reflection back at point A is zero (two events, arrival and reflection are happening at the same point in space and time). For light signals, the space-time interval is zero and thus setting $ds = 0$ in the above equation, we can solve for dx^{0} obtaining two roots:

$$dx^{0(1)} = \frac{1}{g_{00}} \left ( -g_{0\alpha}\, dx^\alpha - \sqrt{\left ( g_{0\alpha}g_{0\beta} - g_{\alpha \beta}g_{00} \right )\, dx^\alpha \,dx^\beta} \right ),$$

| $dx^{0(2)} = \frac{1}{g_{00}} \left ( -g_{0\alpha}\, dx^\alpha + \sqrt{\left ( g_{0\alpha}g_{0\beta} - g_{\alpha \beta}g_{00} \right ) \,dx^\alpha \,dx^\beta} \right ),$ | eq. 2 |

which correspond to the propagation of the signal in both directions between Alice and Bob. If x^{0} is the moment of arrival/reflection of the signal to/from Alice in Bob's clock then, the moments of signal departure from Bob and its arrival back to Bob correspond, respectively, to x^{0} + dx^{0 (1)} and x^{0} + dx^{0 (2)}. The thick lines on Fig. 1 are the world lines of Alice and Bob with coordinates x^{α} and x^{α} + dx^{α}, respectively, while the red lines are the world lines of the signals. Fig. 1 supposes that dx^{0 (2)} is positive and dx^{0 (1)} is negative, which, however, is not necessarily the case: dx^{0 (1)} and dx^{0 (2)} may have the same sign. The fact that in the latter case the value x^{0} (Alice) in the moment of signal arrival at Alice's position may be less than the value x^{0} (Bob) in the moment of signal departure from Bob does not contain a contradiction because clocks in different points of space are not supposed to be synchronized. It is clear that the full "time" interval between departure and arrival of the signal in Bob's place is

$$dx^{0(2)} - dx^{0(1)} = \frac{2}{g_{00}} \sqrt{\left ( g_{0\alpha}g_{0\beta} - g_{\alpha \beta}g_{00} \right ) \,dx^\alpha \,dx^\beta}.$$

The respective proper time interval is obtained from the above relationship by multiplication by $\sqrt{g_{00}}/c$, and the distance dl between the two points – by additional multiplication by c/2. As a result:

| $dl^2 = \left ( -g_{\alpha \beta} + \frac{g_{0\alpha}g_{0\beta}}{g_{00}} \right )\, dx^\alpha \,dx^\beta.$ | eq. 3 |

This is the required relationship that defines distance through the space coordinate elements.

It is obvious that such synchronization should be done by exchange of light signals between points. Consider again propagation of signals between infinitesimally close points A and B in Fig. 1. The clock reading in B which is simultaneous with the moment of reflection in A lies in the middle between the moments of sending and receiving the signal in B; in this moment if Alice's clock reads y^{0} and Bob's clock reads x^{0} then via Einstein Synchronization condition,

$$y^0 = \frac{(x^0 + dx^{0(1)}) + (x^0 + dx^{0(2)}) }{2} = x^0 + \tfrac{1}{2} \left ( dx^{0(2)} + dx^{0(1)} \right ) = x^0 + \Delta x^0 .$$

Substitute here eq. 2 to find the difference in "time" x^{0} between two simultaneous events occurring in infinitesimally close points as

| $\Delta x^0 = -\frac{g_{0 \alpha}\, dx^\alpha}{g_{00}} \equiv g_\alpha \,dx^\alpha.$ | eq. 4 |

This relationship allows clock synchronization in any infinitesimally small space volume. By continuing such synchronization further from point A, one can synchronize clocks, that is, determine simultaneity of events along any open line. The synchronization condition can be written in another form by multiplying eq. 4 by g_{00} and bringing terms to the left hand side

| $\Delta x_0 = g_{0i} dx^i = 0$ | eq. 5 |

or, the "covariant differential" dx_{0} between two infinitesimally close points should be zero.

However, it is impossible, in general, to synchronize clocks along a closed contour: starting out along the contour and returning to the starting point one would obtain a Δx^{0} value different from zero. Thus, unambiguous synchronization of clocks over the whole space is impossible. An exception are reference frames in which all components g_{0α} are zeros.

The inability to synchronize all clocks is a property of the reference frame and not of the spacetime itself. It is always possible in infinitely many ways in any gravitational field to choose the reference frame so that the three g_{0α} become zeros and thus enable a complete synchronization of clocks. To this class are assigned cases where g_{0α} can be made zeros by a simple change in the time coordinate which does not involve a choice of a system of objects that define the space coordinates.

In the special relativity theory, too, proper time elapses differently for clocks moving relatively to each other. In general relativity, proper time is different even in the same reference frame at different points of space. This means that the interval of proper time between two events occurring at some space point and the time interval between the events simultaneous with those at another space point are, in general, different.

=== Example: Uniformly rotating frame ===
Consider a rest (inertial) frame expressed in cylindrical coordinates $r'\,\phi',\,z'$ and time $t'$. The interval in this frame is given by $ds^2=c^2dt'^2-dr'^2 -r'^2d\phi'^2-dz'^2.$ Transforming to a uniformly rotating coordinate system $(r,\phi,z)$ using the relation $x^0/c=t=t',\,x^1=r=r',\, x^2=\phi=\phi'-\Omega t',\, x^3=z=z'$ modifies the interval to

$$ds^2=(c^2-\Omega^2 r^2)dt^2-2\Omega r^2d\phi dt -dr^2 -r^2d\phi^2-dz^2.$$

Of course, the rotating frame is valid only for $r<c/\Omega$ since the frame speed would exceed speed of light beyond this radial location. The non-zero components of the metric tensor are $g_{00}=1-\Omega^2r^2/c^2,$ $g_{02}=-2\Omega r^2/c,$ $g_{11}=-1,$ $g_{22}=-r^2$ and $g_{33}=-1.$ Along any open curve, the relation

$$\Delta x^0 = -\frac{g_{0\alpha}}{g_{00}}dx^\alpha= \frac{\Omega r^2/c}{1-\Omega^2 r^2/c^2}d\phi$$

can be used to synchronize clocks. However, along any closed curve, synchronization is impossible because

$$\oint \Delta x^0 = \oint \frac{d\phi\Omega r^2/c}{1-\Omega^2 r^2/c^2} \neq 0.$$

For instance, when $\Omega r/c\ll 1$, we have

$$\oint \Delta x^0 = \frac{\Omega}{c}\oint r^2d\phi=\pm \frac{2\Omega}{c} S$$

where $S$ is the projected area of the closed curve on a plane perpendicular to the rotation axis (plus or minus sign corresponds to contour traversing in, or opposite to the rotation direction).

The proper time element in the rotating frame is given by

$$d\tau = \sqrt{1-\Omega^2 r^2/c^2}dt=\sqrt{1-\Omega^2 r^2/c^2} d\tau_{\mathrm{axis}}$$

indicating that time slows down as we move away from the axis. Similarly the spatial element can be calculated to find

$$dl = \left[dr^2 + \frac{r^2d\phi^2}{1-\Omega^2r^2/c^2} +dz^2\right]^{1/2}.$$

At a fixed value of $r$ and $z$, the spatial element is $dl=(1-\Omega^2r^2/c^2)^{-1/2}rd\phi$ which upon integration over a full circle shows that the ratio of circumference of a circle to its radius is given by

$$\frac{2\pi}{\sqrt{1-\Omega^2r^2/c^2}}$$

which is greater than by $2\pi$.

== Space metric tensor ==
Eq. 3 can be rewritten in the form

| $dl^2 = \gamma_{\alpha \beta} \,dx^\alpha\, dx^\beta,$ | eq. 6 |

where

| $\gamma_{\alpha \beta} = -g_{\alpha \beta} + \frac{g_{0\alpha}g_{0\beta}}{g_{00}}$ | eq. 7 |

is the three-dimensional metric tensor that determines the metric, that is, the geometrical properties of space. Equations eq. 7 give the relationships between the metric of the three-dimensional space $\gamma_{\alpha \beta}$ and the metric of the four-dimensional spacetime $g_{ik}$.

In general, however, $g_{ik}$ depends on x^{0} so that $\gamma_{\alpha \beta}$ changes with time. Therefore, it doesn't make sense to integrate dl: this integral depends on the choice of world line between the two points on which it is taken. It follows that in general relativity the distance between two bodies cannot be determined in general; this distance is determined only for infinitesimally close points. Distance can be determined for finite space regions only in such reference frames in which g_{ik} does not depend on time and therefore the integral $\int dl$ along the space curve acquires some definite sense.

The tensor $-\gamma_{\alpha \beta}$ is inverse to the contravariant 3-dimensional tensor $g^{\alpha \beta}$. Indeed, writing equation $g^{ik}g_{kl} = \delta_l^i$ in components, one has:

$$g^{\alpha \beta}g_{\beta \gamma} + g^{\alpha 0}g_{0 \gamma} = \delta_\gamma^\alpha,$$

| $g^{\alpha \beta}g_{\beta 0} + g^{\alpha 0}g_{00} = 0,$ | eqs. 8 |

$$g^{0 \beta}g_{\beta 0} + g^{00}g_{00} = 1.$$

Determining $g^{\alpha 0}$ from the second equation and substituting it in the first proves that

| $-g^{\alpha \beta} \gamma_{\beta \gamma} = \delta_\gamma^\alpha,$ | eq. 9 |

This result can be presented otherwise by saying that $g^{\alpha \beta}$ are components of a contravariant 3-dimensional tensor corresponding to metric $\gamma^{\alpha \beta}$:

| $\gamma^{\alpha \beta} = -g^{\alpha \beta}.$ | eq. 10 |

The determinants g and $\gamma$ composed of elements $g_{ik}$ and $\gamma_{\alpha \beta}$, respectively, are related to each other by the simple relationship:

| $-g = g_{00}\gamma.$ | eq. 11 |

In many applications, it is convenient to define a 3-dimensional vector g with covariant components

| $g_\alpha = -\frac{g_{0 \alpha}}{g_{00}}.$ | eq. 12 |

Considering g as a vector in space with metric $\gamma_{\alpha \beta}$, its contravariant components can be written as $g^{\alpha} = \gamma^{\alpha \beta} g_{\beta}$. Using eq. 11 and the second of eqs. 8, it is easy to see that

| $g^\alpha = \gamma^{\alpha \beta} g_\beta = -g^{0 \alpha}.$ | eq. 13 |

From the third of eqs. 8, it follows

| $g^{00} = \frac{1}{g_{00}} - g_\alpha g^\alpha.$ | eq. 14 |

== Synchronous coordinates ==
As concluded from eq. 5, the condition that allows clock synchronization in different space points is that metric tensor components g_{0α} are zeros. If, in addition, g_{00} = 1, then the time coordinate x^{0} = t is the proper time in each space point (with c = 1). A reference frame that satisfies the conditions

| $g_{00} = 1, \quad g_{0 \alpha} = 0,$ | eq. 15 |

is called synchronous frame. The interval element in this system is given by the expression

| $ds^2 = dt^2 - g_{\alpha \beta}\, dx^\alpha\, dx^\beta,$ | eq. 16 |

with the spatial metric tensor components identical (with opposite sign) to the components g_{αβ}:

| $\gamma_{\alpha \beta} = -g_{\alpha \beta}.$ | eq. 17 |

Figure 2. A synchronous frame built with the choice of the timelike hypersurface t = const (teal color). Only one spatial coordinate x^{1} = x is shown. The four observers have the same proper times x^{0} = t which are normal to the hypersurface in their locally flat spacetimes (shown by the light cones). The unit vector n^{0} = u^{0} = 1 is shown in yellow. There are no spatial velocity components (u^{α} = 0) so the common proper time is a geodesic line with a beginning at the hypersurface and a positive direction (red arrows).

In synchronous frame time, time lines are normal to the hypersurfaces t = const. Indeed, the unit four-vector normal to such a hypersurface n_{i} = ∂t/∂x^{i} has covariant components n_{α} = 0, n_{0} = 1. The respective contravariant components with the conditions eq. 15 are again n^{α} = 0, n^{0} = 1.

The components of the unit normal coincide with those of the four-vector u^{i} = dx^{i}/ds which is tangent to the world line x^{1}, x^{2}, x^{3} = const. The u^{i} with components u^{α} = 0, u^{0} = 1 automatically satisfies the geodesic equations:

$$\frac{du^i}{ds} + \Gamma_{kl}^i u^k u^l = \Gamma_{00}^i = 0,$$

since, from the conditions eq. 15, the Christoffel symbols $\Gamma_{00}^{\alpha}$ and $\Gamma_{00}^0$ vanish identically. Therefore, in the synchronous frame the time lines are geodesics in the spacetime.

These properties can be used to construct synchronous frame in any spacetime (Fig. 2). To this end, choose some spacelike hypersurface as an origin, such that has in every point a normal along the time line (lies inside the light cone with an apex in that point); all interval elements on this hypersurface are space-like. Then draw a family of geodesics normal to this hypersurface. Choose these lines as time coordinate lines and define the time coordinate t as the length s of the geodesic measured with a beginning at the hypersurface; the result is a synchronous frame.

An analytic transformation to synchronous frame can be done with the use of the Hamilton–Jacobi equation. The principle of this method is based on the fact that particle trajectories in gravitational fields are geodesics. The Hamilton–Jacobi equation for a particle (whose mass is set equal to unity) in a gravitational field is

| $g^{ik} \frac{\partial S}{\partial x^i} \frac{\partial S}{\partial x^k} = 1,$ | eq. 18a |

where S is the action. Its complete integral has the form:

| $S = f \left ( \xi^{\alpha}, x^i \right ) + A \left ( \xi^{\alpha} \right ),$ | eq. 18b |

Note that the complete integral contains as many arbitrary constants as the number of independent variables which in our case is $4$. In the above equation, these correspond to the three parameters ξ^{α} and the fourth constant A being treated as an arbitrary function of the three ξ^{α}. With such a representation for S the equations for the trajectory of the particle can be obtained by equating the derivatives ∂S/∂ξ^{α} to zero, i.e.

| $\frac{\partial f}{\partial \xi^{\alpha}} = - \frac{\partial A}{\partial \xi^{\alpha}}.$ | eq. 18c |

For each set of assigned values of the parameters ξ^{α}, the right sides of equations 18a-18c have definite constant values, and the world line determined by these equations is one of the possible trajectories of the particle. Choosing the quantities ξ^{α}, which are constant along the trajectory, as new space coordinates, and the quantity S as the new time coordinate, one obtains a synchronous frame; the transformation from the old coordinates to the new ones is given by equations 18b-18c. In fact, it is guaranteed that for such a transformation the time lines will be geodesics and will be normal to the hypersurfaces S = const. The latter point is obvious from the mechanical analogy: the four-vector ∂S/∂x^{i} which is normal to the hypersurface coincides in mechanics with the four-momentum of the particle, and therefore coincides in direction with its four-velocity u^{i} i.e. with the four-vector tangent to the trajectory. Finally the condition g_{00} = 1 is obviously satisfied, since the derivative −dS/ds of the action along the trajectory is the mass of the particle, which was set equal to 1; therefore |dS/ds| = 1.

The gauge conditions eq. 15 do not fix the coordinate system completely and therefore are not a fixed gauge, as the spacelike hypersurface at $t=0$ can be chosen arbitrarily. One still have the freedom of performing some coordinate transformations containing four arbitrary functions depending on the three spatial variables x^{α}, which are easily worked out in infinitesimal form:

| $x^i = \tilde{x}^i + \xi^i(\tilde{x}).$ | eq. 18 |

Here, the collections of the four old coordinates (t, x^{α}) and four new coordinates $(\tilde{t}, \tilde{x}^{\alpha})$ are denoted by the symbols x and $\tilde{x}$, respectively. The functions $\xi^i(\tilde{x})$ together with their first derivatives are infinitesimally small quantities. After such a transformation, the four-dimensional interval takes the form:

| $ds^2 = g_{ik}(x)dx^i dx^k = g^\text{(new)}_{ik} (\tilde{x})d\tilde{x}^i d\tilde{x}^k,$ | eq. 19 |

where

| $g^\text{(new)}_{ik} (\tilde{x}) = g_{ik} (\tilde{x}) + g_{il} (\tilde{x}) \frac{\partial \xi^l (\tilde{x})}{\partial \tilde{x}^k} + g_{kl} (\tilde{x}) \frac{\partial \xi^l (\tilde{x})}{\partial \tilde{x}^i} + \frac{\partial g_{ik} (\tilde{x})}{\partial \tilde{x}^l} \xi^l (\tilde{x}).$ | eq. 20 |

In the last formula, the $g_{ik}(\tilde{x})$ are the same functions g_{ik}(x) in which x should simply be replaced by $\tilde{x}$. If one wishes to preserve the gauge eq. 15 also for the new metric tensor $g^\text{(new)}_{ik} (\tilde{x})$ in the new coordinates $\tilde{x}$, it is necessary to impose the following restrictions on the functions $\xi^i (\acute{x})$:

| $\frac{\partial \xi^0 (\tilde{x})}{\partial \tilde{x}} = 0, \quad g_{\alpha \beta} (\tilde{x}) \frac{\partial \xi^{\beta} (\tilde{x})}{\partial \tilde{t}} - \frac{\partial \xi^0 (\tilde{x})}{\partial \tilde{x}^{\alpha}} = 0.$ | eq. 21 |

The solutions of these equations are:

| $\xi^0 = f^0 \left (\tilde{x}^1, \tilde{x}^2, \tilde{x}^3 \right ), \quad \xi^{\alpha} = \int{g^{\alpha \beta} (\tilde{x}) \frac{\partial f^0 \left (\tilde{x}^1, \tilde{x}^2, \tilde{x}^3 \right )}{\partial \tilde{x}^{\beta}} d \tilde{x}^0 } + f^{\alpha} \left (\tilde{x}^1, \tilde{x}^2, \tilde{x}^3 \right ),$ | eq. 22 |

where f^{0} and f^{α} are four arbitrary functions depending only on the spatial coordinates $\tilde{x}^{\alpha}$.

For a more elementary geometrical explanation, consider Fig. 2. First, the synchronous time line ξ^{0} = t can be chosen arbitrarily (Bob's, Carol's, Dana's or any of an infinitely many observers). This makes one arbitrarily chosen function: $\xi^0 = f^0 \left (\tilde{x}^1, \tilde{x}^2, \tilde{x}^3 \right )$. Second, the initial hypersurface can be chosen in infinitely many ways. Each of these choices changes three functions: one function for each of the three spatial coordinates $\xi^{\alpha} = f^{\alpha} \left (\tilde{x}^1, \tilde{x}^2, \tilde{x}^3 \right )$. Altogether, four (= 1 + 3) functions are arbitrary.

When discussing general solutions g_{αβ} of the field equations in synchronous gauges, it is necessary to keep in mind that the gravitational potentials g_{αβ} contain, among all possible arbitrary functional parameters present in them, four arbitrary functions of 3-space just representing the gauge freedom and therefore of no direct physical significance.

Another problem with the synchronous frame is that caustics can occur which cause the gauge choice to break down. These problems have caused some difficulties doing cosmological perturbation theory in synchronous frame, but the problems are now well understood. Synchronous coordinates are generally considered the most efficient reference system for doing calculations, and are used in many modern cosmology codes, such as CMBFAST. They are also useful for solving theoretical problems in which a spacelike hypersurface needs to be fixed, as with spacelike singularities.

== Einstein equations in synchronous frame ==
Introduction of a synchronous frame allows one to separate the operations of space and time differentiation in the Einstein field equations. To make them more concise, the notation

| $\varkappa_{\alpha \beta} = \frac{\partial \gamma_{\alpha \beta}}{\partial t}$ | eq. 23 |

is introduced for the time derivatives of the three-dimensional metric tensor; these quantities also form a three-dimensional tensor. In the synchronous frame $\varkappa_{\alpha \beta}$ is proportional to the second fundamental form (shape tensor). All operations of shifting indices and covariant differentiation of the tensor $\varkappa_{\alpha \beta}$ are done in three-dimensional space with the metric γ_{αβ}. This does not apply to operations of shifting indices in the space components of the four-tensors R_{ik}, T_{ik}. Thus T_{α}^{β} must be understood to be g^{βγ}T_{γα} + g^{β0}T_{0α}, which reduces to g^{βγ}T_{γα} and differs in sign from γ^{βγ}T_{γα}. The sum $\varkappa_{\alpha}^{\alpha}$ is the logarithmic derivative of the determinant γ ≡ |γ_{αβ}| = − g:

| $\varkappa_{\alpha}^{\alpha} = \gamma^{\alpha \beta} \frac{\partial \gamma_{\alpha \beta}}{\partial t} = \frac{\partial}{\partial t} \ln{(\gamma)}.$ | eq. 24 |

Then for the complete set of Christoffel symbols $\Gamma_{kl}^i$ one obtains:

| $\Gamma_{00}^{0} = \Gamma_{00}^{\alpha} = \Gamma_{0 \alpha}^0 = 0, \quad \Gamma_{\alpha \beta}^0 = \frac{1}{2} \varkappa_{\alpha \beta}, \quad \Gamma_{0 \beta}^{\alpha} = \frac{1}{2} \varkappa_{\beta}^{\alpha}, \quad \Gamma_{\alpha \beta}^{\gamma} = \lambda_{\alpha \beta}^{\gamma}$ | eq. 25 |

where $\lambda_{\alpha \beta}^{\gamma}$ are the three-dimensional Christoffel symbols constructed from γ_{αβ}:

| $\lambda_{\alpha \beta}^{\gamma} = \frac{1}{2} \gamma^{\gamma \mu} \left ( \gamma_{\mu \alpha,\beta} + \gamma_{\mu \beta,\beta} - \gamma_{\alpha \beta,\mu} \right ),$ | eq. 26 |

where the comma denotes partial derivative by the respective coordinate.

With the Christoffel symbols eq. 25, the components R^{i}_{k} = g^{il}R_{lk} of the Ricci tensor can be written in the form:

| $R_0^0=-\frac{1}{2} \dot{\varkappa}-\frac{1}{4} \varkappa_{\alpha}^{\beta} \varkappa_{\beta}^{\alpha},$ | eq. 27 |

| $R_{\alpha}^{0}=\frac{1}{2} \left (\varkappa_{\alpha;\beta}^{\beta} - \varkappa_{,\alpha} \right ),$ | eq. 28 |

| $R_{\alpha}^{\beta}=-\frac{1}{2 \sqrt{\gamma}} \dot{\left (\sqrt{\gamma} \varkappa_{\alpha}^{\beta} \right )} - P_{\alpha}^{\beta}.$ | eq. 29 |

Dots on top denote time differentiation, semicolons (";") denote covariant differentiation which in this case is performed with respect to the three-dimensional metric γ_{αβ} with three-dimensional Christoffel symbols $\lambda_{\alpha \beta}^{\gamma}$, $\varkappa \equiv \varkappa_{\alpha}^{\alpha}$, and P_{α}^{β} is a three-dimensional Ricci tensor constructed from $\lambda_{\alpha \beta}^{\gamma}$:

| $P_{\alpha}^{\beta} = \gamma^{\beta \gamma} P_{\gamma \alpha}, \quad P_{\alpha \beta} = \lambda_{\alpha \beta, \gamma}^{\gamma} - \lambda_{\gamma \alpha, \beta}^{\gamma} + \lambda_{\alpha \beta}^{\gamma} \lambda_{\gamma \mu}^{\mu} - \lambda_{\alpha \mu}^{\gamma} \lambda_{\beta \gamma}^{\mu}.$ | eq. 30 |

It follows from eq. 27–29 that the Einstein equations $R_i^k = 8 \pi k \left ( T_i^k - \frac{1}{2} \delta_i^k T \right )$ (with the components of the energy–momentum tensor T_{0}^{0} = −T_{00}, T_{α}^{0} = −T_{0α}, T_{α}^{β} = γ^{βγ}T_{γα}) become in a synchronous frame:

| $R_0^0=-\frac{1}{2} \dot{\varkappa}-\frac{1}{4} \varkappa_{\alpha}^{\beta} \varkappa_{\beta}^{\alpha} = 8 \pi k \left ( T_0^0 - \frac{1}{2} T \right ),$ | eq. 31 |

| $R_{\alpha}^{0}=\frac{1}{2} \left (\varkappa_{\alpha;\beta}^{\beta} - \varkappa_{,\alpha} \right ) = 8 \pi k T_{\alpha}^0,$ | eq. 32 |

| $R_{\alpha}^{\beta}=-\frac{1}{2 \sqrt{\gamma}} \dot{\left (\sqrt{\gamma} \varkappa_{\alpha}^{\beta} \right )} - P_{\alpha}^{\beta} = 8 \pi k \left ( T_{\alpha}^{\beta} - \frac{1}{2} \delta_{\alpha}^{\beta} T \right ).$ | eq. 33 |

A characteristic feature of the synchronous frame is that it is not stationary: the gravitational field cannot be constant in such frame. In a constant field $\varkappa_{\alpha \beta}$ would become zero. But in the presence of matter the disappearance of all $\varkappa_{\alpha \beta}$ would contradict eq. 31 (which has a right side different from zero). In empty space from eq. 33 follows that all P_{αβ}, and with them all the components of the three-dimensional curvature tensor P_{αβγδ} (Riemann tensor) vanish, i.e. the field vanishes entirely (in a synchronous frame with a Euclidean spatial metric the space-time is flat).

At the same time the matter filling the space cannot in general be at rest relative to the synchronous frame. This is obvious from the fact that particles of matter within which there are pressures generally move along lines that are not geodesics; the world line of a particle at rest is a time line, and thus is a geodesic in the synchronous frame. An exception is the case of dust (p = 0). Here the particles interacting with one another will move along geodesic lines; consequently, in this case the condition for a synchronous frame does not contradict the condition that it be comoving with the matter. Even in this case, in order to be able to choose a synchronously comoving frame, it is still necessary that the matter move without rotation. In the comoving frame the contravariant components of the velocity are u^{0} = 1, u^{α} = 0. If the frame is also synchronous, the covariant components must satisfy u_{0} = 1, u_{α} = 0, so that its four-dimensional curl must vanish:

$$u_{i;k} - u_{k;i} \equiv \frac{\partial u_i}{\partial x^k} - \frac{\partial u_k}{\partial x^i} = 0.$$

But this tensor equation must then also be valid in any other reference frame. Thus, in a synchronous but not comoving frame the condition curl v = 0 for the three-dimensional velocity v is additionally needed. For other equations of state a similar situation can occur only in special cases when the pressure gradient vanishes in all or in certain directions.

== Singularity in synchronous frame ==
Use of the synchronous frame in cosmological problems requires thorough examination of its asymptotic behaviour. In particular, it must be known if the synchronous frame can be extended to infinite time and infinite space maintaining always the unambiguous labelling of every point in terms of coordinates in this frame.

It was shown that unambiguous synchronization of clocks over the whole space is impossible because of the impossibility to synchronize clocks along a closed contour. As concerns synchronization over infinite time, let's first remind that the time lines of all observers are normal to the chosen hypersurface and in this sense are "parallel". Traditionally, the concept of parallelism is defined in Euclidean geometry to mean straight lines that are everywhere equidistant from each other but in arbitrary geometries this concept can be extended to mean lines that are geodesics. It was shown that time lines are geodesics in synchronous frame. Another, more convenient for the present purpose definition of parallel lines are those that have all or none of their points in common. Excluding the case of all points in common (obviously, the same line) one arrives to the definition of parallelism where no two time lines have a common point.

Since the time lines in a synchronous frame are geodesics, these lines are straight (the path of light) for all observers in the generating hypersurface. The spatial metric is

$$dl^2 = \gamma_{\alpha \beta} dx^{\alpha} dx^{\beta}$$.

The determinant $\gamma$ of the metric tensor is the absolute value of the triple product of the row vectors in the matrix $\gamma_{\alpha \beta}$ which is also the volume of the parallelepiped spanned by the vectors ${\vec \gamma}_1$, ${\vec \gamma}_2$, and ${\vec \gamma}_3$ (i.e., the parallelepiped whose adjacent sides are the vectors ${\vec \gamma}_1$, ${\vec \gamma}_2$, and ${\vec \gamma}_3$).

$$\gamma = |{\vec \gamma}_1 \cdot({\vec \gamma}_2 \times {\vec \gamma}_3)| =
\begin{vmatrix}
\gamma _{11} & \gamma _{12} & \gamma _{13} \\
\gamma _{21} & \gamma _{22} & \gamma _{23} \\
\gamma _{31} & \gamma _{32} & \gamma _{33}
\end{vmatrix}
= V_\text{parallelepiped}$$

If $\gamma$ turns into zero then the volume of this parallelepiped is zero. This can happen when one of the vectors lies in the plane of the other two vectors so that the parallelepiped volume transforms to the area of the base (height becomes zero), or more formally, when two of the vectors are linearly dependent. But then multiple points (the points of intersection) can be labelled in the same way, that is, the metric has a singularity.

The Landau group have found that the synchronous frame necessarily forms a time singularity, that is, the time lines intersect (and, respectively, the metric tensor determinant turns to zero) in a finite time.

This is proven in the following way. The right-hand of the eq. 31, containing the stress–energy tensors of matter and electromagnetic field,

$$T_i^k = \left(p + \varepsilon \right) \times u_i u^k + p \delta_i^k$$

is a positive number because of the strong energy condition. This can be easily seen when written in components.

for matter
$$T_0^0 - \frac{1}{2} T = \frac{1}{2} \left( \varepsilon + 3p \right) + \frac{\left( p + \varepsilon \right) v^2}{1 - v^2} > 0$$
for electromagnetic field
$$T = 0, \quad T_0^0 = {1 \over 2}\left(\epsilon_0 E^2 + \frac{1}{\mu_0} B^2 \right) > 0$$

With the above in mind, the eq. 31 is then re-written as an inequality

| $-R_0^0 = \frac{1}{2} \frac{\partial}{\partial t} \varkappa_{\alpha}^{\alpha}+\frac{1}{4} \varkappa_{\alpha}^{\beta} \varkappa_{\beta}^{\alpha} \leq 0$ | eq. 34 |

with the equality pertaining to empty space.

Using the algebraic inequality

$$\varkappa_{\beta}^{\alpha}\varkappa_{\alpha}^{\beta} \geq \frac{1} {3}\left(\varkappa_{\alpha}^{\alpha}\right)^2$$

eq. 34 becomes

$$\frac{\partial}{\partial t} \varkappa_{\alpha}^{\alpha}+\frac{1}{6} \left( \varkappa_{\alpha}^{\alpha} \right)^2 \leq 0$$.

Dividing both sides to $\left( \varkappa_{\alpha}^{\alpha} \right)^2$ and using the equality

$$\frac{1}{\left( \varkappa_{\alpha}^{\alpha} \right)^2} \frac{\partial}{\partial t} \varkappa_{\alpha}^{\alpha} = - \frac{\partial}{\partial t} \frac{1}{\varkappa_{\alpha}^{\alpha}}$$

one arrives to the inequality

| $\frac{\partial}{\partial t} \frac{1}{\varkappa_{\alpha}^{\alpha}} \geq {1 \over 6}$. | eq. 35 |

Let, for example, $\varkappa_{\alpha}^{\alpha} > 0$ at some moment of time. Because the derivative is positive, then the ratio $\frac{1}{\varkappa_{\alpha}^{\alpha}}$ decreases with decreasing time, always having a finite non-zero derivative and, therefore, it should become zero, coming from the positive side, during a finite time. In other words, $\varkappa_{\alpha}^{\alpha}$ becomes $+ \infty$, and because $\varkappa_{\alpha}^{\alpha} = \partial \ln \gamma / \partial t$, this means that the determinant $\gamma$ becomes zero (according to eq. 35 not faster than $t^6$). If, on the other hand, $\varkappa_{\alpha}^{\alpha} < 0$ initially, the same is true for increasing time.

An idea about the space at the singularity can be obtained by considering the diagonalized metric tensor. Diagonalization makes the elements of the $\gamma_{\alpha \beta}$ matrix everywhere zero except the main diagonal whose elements are the three eigenvalues $\lambda_1, \lambda_2$ and $\lambda_3$; these are three real values when the discriminant of the characteristic polynomial is greater or equal to zero or one real and two complex conjugate values when the discriminant is less than zero. Then the determinant $\gamma$ is just the product of the three eigenvalues. If only one of these eigenvalues becomes zero, then the whole determinant is zero. Let, for example, the real eigenvalue becomes zero ($\lambda_1 = 0$). Then the diagonalized matrix $\gamma_{\alpha \beta}$ becomes a 2 × 2 matrix with the (generally complex conjugate) eigenvalues $\lambda_2, \lambda_3$ on the main diagonal. But this matrix is the diagonalized metric tensor of the space where $\gamma = 0$; therefore, the above suggests that at the singularity ($\gamma = 0$) the space is 2-dimensional when only one eigenvalue turns to zero.

Geometrically, diagonalization is a rotation of the basis for the vectors comprising the matrix in such a way that the direction of basis vectors coincide with the direction of the eigenvectors. If $\gamma_{\alpha \beta}$ is a real symmetric matrix, the eigenvectors form an orthonormal basis defining a rectangular parallelepiped whose length, width, and height are the magnitudes of the three eigenvalues. This example is especially demonstrative in that the determinant $\gamma$ which is also the volume of the parallelepiped is equal to length × width × height, i.e., the product of the eigenvalues. Making the volume of the parallelepiped equal to zero, for example by equating the height to zero, leaves only one face of the parallelepiped, a 2-dimensional space, whose area is length × width. Continuing with the obliteration and equating the width to zero, one is left with a line of size length, a 1-dimensional space. Further equating the length to zero leaves only a point, a 0-dimensional space, which marks the place where the parallelepiped has been.

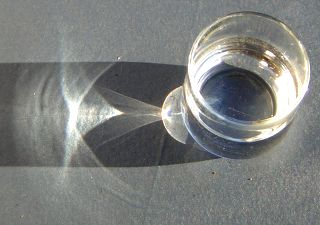
Figure 3.

An analogy from geometrical optics is comparison of the singularity with caustics, such as the bright pattern in Fig. 3, which shows caustics formed by a glass of water illuminated from the right side. The light rays are an analogue of the time lines of the free-falling observers localized on the synchronized hypersurface. Judging by the approximately parallel sides of the shadow contour cast by the glass, one can surmise that the light source is at a practically infinite distance from the glass (such as the sun) but this is not certain as the light source is not shown on the photo. So one can suppose that the light rays (time lines) are parallel without this being proven with certainty. The glass of water is an analogue of the Einstein equations or the agent(s) behind them that bend the time lines to form the caustics pattern (the singularity). The latter is not as simple as the face of a parallelepiped but is a complicated mix of various kinds of intersections. One can distinguish an overlap of two-, one-, or zero-dimensional spaces, i.e., intermingling of surfaces and lines, some converging to a point (cusp) such as the arrowhead formation in the centre of the caustics pattern.

The conclusion that timelike geodesic vector fields must inevitably reach a singularity after a finite time has been reached independently by Raychaudhuri by another method that led to the Raychaudhuri equation, which is also called Landau–Raychaudhuri equation to honour both researchers.

== See also ==
- Normal coordinates
- Congruence (general relativity), for a derivation of the kinematical decomposition and of Raychaudhuri's equation.

== Bibliography ==
- Landau, Lev D.; Lifshitz, Evgeny M. (1988). "§97. The synchronous reference system". Теория поля [Field Theory]. Course of Theoretical Physics (in Russian). Vol. 2 (Izd. 7., ispr ed.). Moskva: Nauka, Glav. red. fiziko-matematicheskoĭ lit-ry. ISBN 5-02-014420-7. OCLC 21793854. (English translation: Landau, L.D. and Lifshitz, E.M. (2000). "#97. The synchronous reference system". The Classical Theory of Fields. Oxford: Elsevier Butterworth Heinemann. ISBN 978-0-7506-2768-9.)
- Lifshitz, Evgeny M.; Sudakov, V.V.; Khalatnikov, I.M. (1961). "Singularities of cosmological solutions of the gravitational equations.III". JETP. 40: 1847.; Physical Review Letters, 6, 311 (1961)
- Arnolʹd, V. I. (1989). Mathematical methods of classical mechanics. Graduate texts in mathematics. Vol. 60 (2nd ed.). New York: Springer-Verlag. ISBN 0-387-96890-3. OCLC 18681352.
- Arnolʹd, V. I. (1996). Особенности каустик и волновых фронтов [Singularities of caustics and wave fronts]. Library of the Mathematician (in Russian). Vol. 1. Moscow: FAZIS. ISBN 5-7036-0021-9. OCLC 43811626.
- Carroll, Sean M. (2019). "Section 7.2". Spacetime and Geometry: An Introduction to General Relativity (1 ed.). San Francisco: Cambridge University Press. Bibcode:2019sgai.book.....C. doi:10.1017/9781108770385. ISBN 978-1-108-48839-6. S2CID 126323605.
- Ma, C.-P. & Bertschinger, E. (1995). "Cosmological perturbation theory in the synchronous and conformal Newtonian gauges". Astrophysical Journal. 455: 7–25. arXiv:astro-ph/9506072. Bibcode:1995ApJ...455....7M. doi:10.1086/176550. S2CID 14570491.
