= Chronometric singularity =

Point at which time cannot be described mathematically

In theoretical physics, a chronometric singularity (also called a temporal or horological singularity) is a point at which time cannot be measured or described.

An example involves a time at a coordinate singularity, e.g. a geographical pole. Since time on Earth is measured through longitudes, and no unique longitude exists at a pole, time is not defined uniquely at this point. There is a clear connection with coordinate singularities, as can be seen from this example. In relativity, similar singularities can be found in the case of Schwarzschild coordinates.

Stephen Hawking once compared by a talk-show guest's question about "before the beginning of time" to asking "what's north of the North Pole".

== See also ==
- Coordinate singularity
- No-boundary proposal and imaginary time
- Spacetime singularity
- Time
