= David Finkelstein =

American physicist (1929-2016)

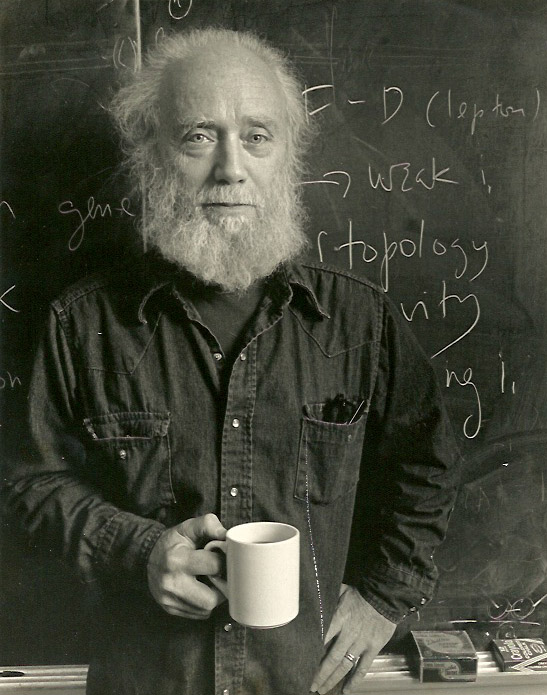
- Finkelstein in 1984
- Born: July 19, 1929; New York City, US
- Died: January 24, 2016 (aged 86); Atlanta, Georgia, US
- Education: Massachusetts Institute of Technology
- Known for: Eddington–Finkelstein coordinates
- Scientific career
- Workplaces: Georgia Institute of Technology; Yeshiva University
- Thesis: Non-linear meson theory of nuclear forces (1953)
- Doctoral advisor: Felix Villars

David Ritz Finkelstein (July 19, 1929 – January 24, 2016) was an emeritus professor of physics at the Georgia Institute of Technology.

== Biography ==
Born in New York City, Finkelstein obtained his Ph.D. in physics at the Massachusetts Institute of Technology in 1953 and taught at Stevens Institute of Technology through 1960, while he also held a Ford Foundation Fellowship at the European Organization for Nuclear Research from 1959 to 1960. From 1964 to 1976, he was professor of physics at Yeshiva University. He became a member of the faculty at Georgia Tech in 1980.

David Finkelstein was the first, in 1958, who identified Schwarzschild's solution of the Einstein field equations as corresponding to a region in space from which nothing escapes. In 1959, Finkelstein and Charles W. Misner found the gravitational kink, a topological defect in the gravitational metric, whose quantum theory could exhibit spin 1/2. The simplest kink exhibited an easily understood event horizon that led him to recognize the one in the Schwarzschild metric and eliminate its coordinate singularity. In essence, Finkelstein determined that whatever falls past the Schwarzschild radius into a black hole cannot escape it; the membrane is one-directional. This important work influenced the decisions of Roger Penrose and John Archibald Wheeler to accept the physical existence of event horizons and black holes.

Most of Finkelstein's work is directed toward a quantum theory of space-time structure. He early on accepted the conclusion of John von Neumann that anomalies of quantum mechanical measurement are anomalies of the logic of quantum mechanical systems. Therefore, he formed quantum analogues of set theory, the standard language for classical space-time structures, and proposed that space-time is a quantum set of space-time quanta dubbed "chronons", a form of quantum computer with spins for quantum bits, as a quantum version of the cellular automaton of von Neumann. His early quantum space-times proving unphysical, he later studied chronons with a regularized form of Bose–Einstein statistics due to Tchavdar D. Palev.

He investigated ball lightning with Julio Rubinstein and James R. Powell. They concluded that ball lightning is most likely a wandering St. Elmo's fire, a low-temperature soliton in the atmospheric electric current flow.

He also put forward an in-depth interpretation of the engraving Melencolia I of Albrecht Dürer.

Finkelstein died from idiopathic pulmonary fibrosis in Atlanta on January 24, 2016, aged 86.

== Universal relativity ==
Influenced by his discussions of Buddhist philosophy at the Mind and Life dialogues, Finkelstein developed a philosophical theory of "universal relativity" which he thought might help advance physics. According to Finkelstein:

The Buddhist principle that all is empty is understood by some as the principle that all is relative (Thurman 1993). This universal relativity principle is more embracing though less structured than Einstein's general relativity principle, which still admits many absolutes. The major changes in physics in this century have been extensions of relativity at one level or another, and I think a further extension is due, at an even deeper level of physics than the previous. Philosophical inquiry has aided such extensions before, and it could do so again. A philosophical argument for a universal relativity could be a useful guide for future physics.

== Books ==
- David Ritz Finkelstein: Quantum relativity: a synthesis of the ideas of Einstein and Heisenberg, Springer, 1996; 2012 pbk reprint of 1996 1st edition ISBN 978-3-642-64612-6
- David Ritz Finkelstein, J. M. Jauch: Notes on quaternion quantum mechanics, CERN, 1959
- Charles Maisonnier, David Ritz Finkelstein: Beam intensity limitation in neutralized space charge betatrons, CERN, 1959
- David Ritz Finkelstein: Non-linear meson theory of nuclear forces, Massachusetts Institute of Technology, Department of Physics, 1952

== Television shows ==
- BBC Horizon: "It's About Time" (1979): Show hosted by Dudley Moore.
- Closer to Truth interview series

== See also ==
- Eddington-Finkelstein coordinates
- Quantum logic
- List of quantum gravity researchers
