= World line =

Path of an object through spacetime

The world line (or worldline) of an object is the path that an object traces in 4-dimensional spacetime. It is an important concept of modern physics, and particularly theoretical physics.

The concept of a "world line" is distinguished from concepts such as an "orbit" or a "trajectory" (e.g., a planet's orbit in space or the trajectory of a car on a road) by inclusion of the dimension time, and typically encompasses a large area of spacetime wherein paths which are straight perceptually are rendered as curves in spacetime to show their (relatively) more absolute position states—to reveal the nature of special relativity or gravitational interactions.

The idea of world lines was originated by physicists and was pioneered by Hermann Minkowski. The term is now used most often in the context of relativity theories (i.e., special relativity and general relativity).

== Usage in physics ==
A world line of an object (generally approximated as a point in space, e.g., a particle or observer) is the sequence of spacetime events corresponding to the history of the object. A world line is a special type of curve in spacetime. Below an equivalent definition will be explained: A world line is either a time-like or a null curve in spacetime. Each point of a world line is an event that can be labeled with the time and the spatial position of the object at that time.

For example, the orbit of the Earth in space is approximately a circle, a three-dimensional (closed) curve in space: the Earth returns every year to the same point in space relative to the sun. However, it arrives there at a different (later) time. The world line of the Earth is therefore helical in four-dimensional spacetime and does not return to the same point.

Spacetime is the collection of events, together with a continuous and smooth coordinate system identifying the events. Each event can be labeled by four numbers: a time coordinate and three space coordinates represented in a four-dimensional space. The concept may be applied as well to a higher dimensional space. In mathematical terms this kind of model is called a manifold (a topological space that locally resembles Euclidean space near each point). The concept may be applied as well to a higher-dimensional space.

For easy visualizations of four dimensions, two space coordinates are often suppressed. An event is then represented by a point in a Minkowski diagram, which is a plane usually plotted with the time coordinate, say $t$, vertically, and the space coordinate, say $x$, horizontally. As expressed by F.R. Harvey

A curve M in [spacetime] is called a worldline of a particle if its tangent is future timelike at each point. The arclength parameter is called proper time and usually denoted τ. The length of M is called the proper time of the particle. If the worldline M is a line segment, then the particle is said to be in free fall.

A world line traces out the path of a single point in spacetime. A world sheet is the analogous two-dimensional surface traced out by a one-dimensional line (like a string) traveling through spacetime. The world sheet of an open string (with loose ends) is a strip; that of a closed string (a loop) resembles a tube.

Once the object is not approximated as a mere point but has extended volume, it traces not a world line but rather a world tube.

== As a method of describing events ==
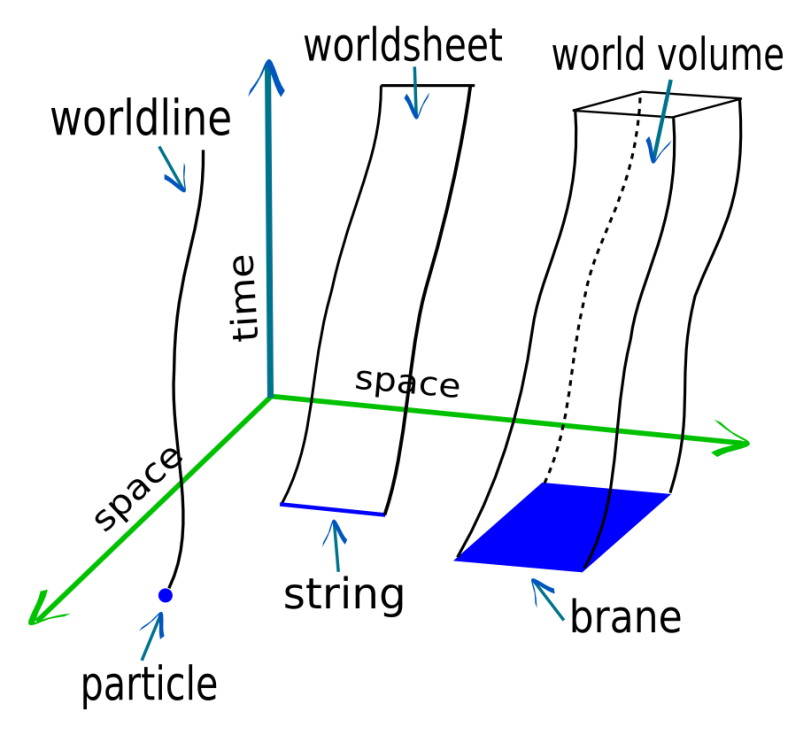
World line, worldsheet, and world volume, as they are derived from particles, strings, and branes

A one-dimensional line or curve can be represented by the coordinates as a function of one parameter. Each value of the parameter corresponds to a point in spacetime and varying the parameter traces out a line. So in mathematical terms a curve is defined by four coordinate functions $x^a(\tau),\; a=0,1,2,3$ (where $x^{0}$ usually denotes the time coordinate) depending on one parameter $\tau$. A coordinate grid in spacetime is the set of curves one obtains if three out of four coordinate functions are set to a constant.

Sometimes, the term world line is used informally for any curve in spacetime. This terminology causes confusions. More properly, a "world line" is a curve in spacetime that traces out the (time) history of a particle, observer or small object. One usually uses the proper time of an object or an observer as the curve parameter $\tau$ along the world line.

=== Trivial examples of spacetime curves ===
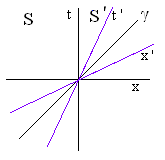
Two worldlines t and t' determine frames of reference S and S' where events simultaneous with the origin lie on x or x' respectively. Line γ is light.

A curve that consists of a horizontal line segment (a line at constant coordinate time), may represent a rod in spacetime and would not be a world line in the proper sense. The parameter simply traces the length of the rod.

A line at constant space coordinate (a vertical line using the convention adopted above) may represent a particle at rest (or a stationary observer). A tilted line represents a particle with a constant coordinate speed (constant change in space coordinate with increasing time coordinate). The more the line is tilted from the vertical, the larger the speed.

Two world lines that start out separately and then intersect, signify a collision or "encounter". Two world lines starting at the same event in spacetime, each following its own path afterwards, may represent e.g. the decay of a particle into two others or the emission of one particle by another.

World lines of a particle and an observer may be interconnected with the world line of a photon (the path of light) and form a diagram depicting the emission of a photon by a particle that is subsequently observed by the observer (or absorbed by another particle).

=== Tangent vector to a world line: four-velocity ===
The four coordinate functions $x^a(\tau),\; a = 0, 1, 2, 3$ defining a world line, are real number functions of a real variable $\tau$ and can simply be differentiated by the usual calculus. Without the existence of a metric (this is important to realize) one can imagine the difference between a point $p$ on the curve at the parameter value $\tau_0$ and a point on the curve a little (parameter $\tau_0 + \Delta\tau$) farther away. In the limit $\Delta\tau \to 0$, this difference divided by $\Delta\tau$ defines a vector, the tangent vector of the world line at the point $p$. It is a four-dimensional vector, defined in the point $p$. It is associated with the normal 3-dimensional velocity of the object (but it is not the same) and therefore termed four-velocity $\vec{v}$, or in components:
$$\vec{v} = \left(v^0, v^1, v^2, v^3\right) = \left( \frac{dx^0}{d\tau}\;,\frac{dx^1}{d\tau}\;, \frac{dx^2}{d\tau}\;, \frac{dx^3}{d\tau} \right)$$

such that the derivatives are taken at the point $p$, so at $\tau = \tau_0$.

All curves through point p have a tangent vector, not only world lines. The sum of two vectors is again a tangent vector to some other curve and the same holds for multiplying by a scalar. Therefore, all tangent vectors for a point p span a linear space, termed the tangent space at point p. For example, taking a 2-dimensional space, like the (curved) surface of the Earth, its tangent space at a specific point would be the flat approximation of the curved space.

== In special relativity ==
So far a world line (and the concept of tangent vectors) has been described without a means of quantifying the interval between events. The basic mathematics is as follows: The theory of special relativity puts some constraints on possible world lines. In special relativity the description of spacetime is limited to special coordinate systems that do not accelerate (and so do not rotate either), termed inertial coordinate systems. In such coordinate systems, the speed of light is a constant. The structure of spacetime is determined by a bilinear form η, which gives a real number for each pair of events. The bilinear form is sometimes termed a spacetime metric, but since distinct events sometimes result in a zero value, unlike metrics in metric spaces of mathematics, the bilinear form is not a mathematical metric on spacetime.

World lines of freely falling particles/objects are called geodesics. In special relativity these are straight lines in Minkowski space.

Often the time units are chosen such that the speed of light is represented by lines at a fixed angle, usually at 45 degrees, forming a cone with the vertical (time) axis. In general, useful curves in spacetime can be of three types (the other types would be partly one, partly another type):

- light-like curves, having at each point the speed of light. They form a cone in spacetime, dividing it into two parts. The cone is three-dimensional in spacetime, appears as a line in drawings with two dimensions suppressed, and as a cone in drawings with one spatial dimension suppressed.

An example of a light cone, the three-dimensional surface of all possible light rays arriving at and departing from a point in spacetime. Here, it is depicted with one spatial dimension suppressed.

The momentarily co-moving inertial frames along the trajectory ("world line") of a rapidly accelerating observer (center). The vertical direction indicates time, while the horizontal indicates distance, the dotted line is the trajectory in spacetime of the observer. The small dots are specific events in spacetime. Note how the momentarily co-moving inertial frame changes when the observer accelerates.

- time-like curves, with a speed less than the speed of light. These curves must fall within a cone defined by light-like curves. In our definition above: world lines are time-like curves in spacetime.
- space-like curves falling outside the light cone. Such curves may describe, for example, the length of a physical object. The circumference of a cylinder and the length of a rod are space-like curves.

At a given event on a world line, spacetime (Minkowski space) is divided into three parts.

- The future of the given event is formed by all events that can be reached through time-like curves lying within the future light cone.
- The past of the given event is formed by all events that can influence the event (that is, that can be connected by world lines within the past light cone to the given event).
  - The lightcone at the given event is formed by all events that can be connected through light rays with the event. When we observe the sky at night, we basically see only the past light cone within the entire spacetime.
- Elsewhere is the region between the two light cones. Points in an observer's elsewhere are inaccessible to them; only points in the past can send signals to the observer. In ordinary laboratory experience, using common units and methods of measurement, it may seem that we look at the present, but in fact there is always a delay time for light to propagate. For example, we see the Sun as it was about 8 minutes ago, not as it is "right now". Unlike the present in Galilean/Newtonian theory, the elsewhere is thick; it is not a 3-dimensional volume but is instead a 4-dimensional spacetime region.
  - Included in "elsewhere" is the simultaneous hyperplane, which is defined for a given observer by a space that is hyperbolic-orthogonal to their world line. It is really three-dimensional, though it would be a 2-plane in the diagram because we had to throw away one dimension to make an intelligible picture. Although the light cones are the same for all observers at a given spacetime event, different observers, with differing velocities but coincident at the event (point) in the spacetime, have world lines that cross each other at an angle determined by their relative velocities, and thus they have different simultaneous hyperplanes.
  - The present often means the single spacetime event being considered.

=== Simultaneous hyperplane ===
Since a world line $w(\tau) \isin R^4$ determines a velocity 4-vector $v = \frac {dw}{d\tau}$ that is time-like, the Minkowski form $\eta(v,x)$ determines a linear function $R^4 \rarr R$ by $x \mapsto \eta( v , x ) .$ Let N be the null space of this linear functional. Then N is called the simultaneous hyperplane with respect to v. The relativity of simultaneity is a statement that N depends on v. Indeed, N is the orthogonal complement of v with respect to η. When two world lines u and w are related by $\frac {du}{d\tau} = \frac {dw}{d\tau},$ then they share the same simultaneous hyperplane. This hyperplane exists mathematically, but physical relations in relativity involve the movement of information by light. For instance, the traditional electro-static force described by Coulomb's law may be pictured in a simultaneous hyperplane, but relativistic relations of charge and force involve retarded potentials.

== In general relativity ==
The use of world lines in general relativity is basically the same as in special relativity, with the difference that spacetime can be curved. A metric exists and its dynamics are determined by the Einstein field equations and are dependent on the mass-energy distribution in spacetime. Again the metric defines lightlike (null), spacelike, and timelike curves. Also, in general relativity, world lines include timelike curves and null curves in spacetime, where timelike curves fall within the lightcone. However, a lightcone is not necessarily inclined at 45 degrees to the time axis. However, this is an artifact of the chosen coordinate system, and reflects the coordinate freedom (diffeomorphism invariance) of general relativity. Any timelike curve admits a comoving observer whose "time axis" corresponds to that curve, and, since no observer is privileged, we can always find a local coordinate system in which lightcones are inclined at 45 degrees to the time axis. See also for example Eddington-Finkelstein coordinates.

World lines of free-falling particles or objects (such as planets around the Sun or an astronaut in space) are called geodesics.

== In quantum field theory ==
Quantum field theory, the framework in which all of modern particle physics is described, is usually described as a theory of quantized fields. However, although not widely appreciated, it has been known since Feynman that many quantum field theories may equivalently be described in terms of world lines. This preceded much of his work on the formulation which later became more standard. The world line formulation of quantum field theory has proved particularly fruitful for various calculations in gauge theories and in describing nonlinear effects of electromagnetic fields.

== In literature ==
In 1884 C. H. Hinton wrote the essay "What is the fourth dimension?", which he published as a scientific romance. He wrote

Why, then, should not the four-dimensional beings be ourselves, and our successive states the passing of them through the three-dimensional space to which our consciousness is confined.

A popular description of human world lines was given by J. C. Fields at the University of Toronto in the early days of relativity. As described by Toronto lawyer Norman Robertson:

I remember [Fields] lecturing at one of the Saturday evening lectures at the Royal Canadian Institute. It was advertised to be a "Mathematical Fantasy"—and it was! The substance of the exercise was as follows: He postulated that, commencing with his birth, every human being had some kind of spiritual aura with a long filament or thread attached, that traveled behind him throughout his life. He then proceeded in imagination to describe the complicated entanglement every individual became involved in his relationship to other individuals, comparing the simple entanglements of youth to those complicated knots that develop in later life.

Kurt Vonnegut, in his novel Slaughterhouse-Five, describes the world lines of stars and people:

"Billy Pilgrim says that the Universe does not look like a lot of bright little dots to the creatures from Tralfamadore. The creatures can see where each star has been and where it is going, so that the heavens are filled with rarefied, luminous spaghetti. And Tralfamadorians don't see human beings as two-legged creatures, either. They see them as great millepedes – "with babies' legs at one end and old people's legs at the other," says Billy Pilgrim."

Almost all science-fiction stories which use this concept actively, such as to enable time travel, oversimplify this concept to a one-dimensional timeline to fit a linear structure, which does not fit models of reality. Such time machines are often portrayed as being instantaneous, with its contents departing one time and arriving in another—but at the same literal geographic point in space. This is often carried out without note of a reference frame, or with the implicit assumption that the reference frame is local; as such, this would require either accurate teleportation, as a rotating planet, being under acceleration, is not an inertial frame, or for the time machine to remain in the same place, its contents 'frozen'.

Author Oliver Franklin published a science fiction work in 2008 entitled World Lines in which he related a simplified explanation of the hypothesis for laymen.

In the short story Life-Line, author Robert A. Heinlein describes the world line of a person:

He stepped up to one of the reporters. "Suppose we take you as an example. Your name is Rogers, is it not? Very well, Rogers, you are a space-time event having duration four ways. You are not quite six feet tall, you are about twenty inches wide and perhaps ten inches thick. In time, there stretches behind you more of this space-time event, reaching to perhaps nineteen-sixteen, of which we see a cross-section here at right angles to the time axis, and as thick as the present. At the far end is a baby, smelling of sour milk and drooling its breakfast on its bib. At the other end lies, perhaps, an old man someplace in the nineteen-eighties.

"Imagine this space-time event that we call Rogers as a long pink worm, continuous through the years, one end in his mother's womb, and the other at the grave..."

Heinlein's Methuselah's Children uses the term, as does James Blish's The Quincunx of Time (expanded from "Beep").

A visual novel named Steins;Gate, produced by 5pb., tells a story based on the shifting of world lines. Steins;Gate is a part of the "Science Adventure" series. World lines and other physical concepts like the Dirac sea are also used throughout the series.

Neal Stephenson's novel Anathem involves a long discussion of world lines over dinner in the midst of a philosophical debate between Platonic realism and nominalism.

Absolute Choice depicts different world lines as a sub-plot and setting device.

A space armada trying to complete a (nearly) closed time-like path as a strategic maneuver forms the backdrop and a main plot device of Singularity Sky by Charles Stross.

== See also ==
- Specific types of world lines
  - Geodesics
  - Closed timelike curves
  - Causal structure, curves that represent a variety of different types of world line
  - Isotropic line
- Feynman diagram
- Time geography
