= Coordinate singularity =

Singularity or discontinuity only resulting from the choice of coordinate system

In mathematics and physics, a coordinate singularity occurs when an apparent singularity or discontinuity occurs in one coordinate frame that can be removed by choosing a different frame.

An example is the apparent (longitudinal) singularity at the 90 degree latitude in spherical coordinates. An object moving due north (for example, along the line 0 degrees longitude) on the surface of a sphere will suddenly experience an instantaneous change in longitude at the pole (i.e., jumping from longitude 0 to longitude 180 degrees). In fact, longitude is not uniquely defined at the poles. This discontinuity, however, is only apparent; it is an artifact of the coordinate system chosen, which is singular at the poles. A different coordinate system would eliminate the apparent discontinuity, e.g. by replacing the latitude/longitude representation with an n-vector representation.

English theoretical physicist Stephen Hawking aptly summed this up, when once asking the question, "What lies north of the North Pole?".

== See also ==
- Chronometric singularity
- Imaginary time
- Mathematical singularity
- No-boundary proposal
- Schwarzschild metric#Singularities and black holes
