= General relativity =

Theory of gravitation as curved spacetime

Slow motion computer simulation of the black hole binary system GW150914, during 0.33 s of its final inspiral, merge, and ringdown. The star field behind the black holes is being heavily distorted and appears to rotate and move, due to extreme gravitational lensing, as spacetime itself is distorted and dragged around by the rotating black holes.

General relativity, also known as the general theory of relativity, and as Einstein's theory of gravity, is the geometric theory of gravitation published by Albert Einstein in May 1916 and is the accepted description of the gravitation of macroscopic objects in modern physics. General relativity generalizes special relativity and refines Isaac Newton's law of universal gravitation, providing a unified description of gravity as a geometric property of space and time, or four-dimensional spacetime. In particular, the curvature of spacetime is directly related to the energy, momentum, and stress of whatever is present, including matter and radiation. The relation is specified by the Einstein field equations, a system of second-order partial differential equations. John Archibald Wheeler summarized it: "Space-time tells matter how to move; matter tells space-time how to curve."

Newton's law of universal gravitation, which describes gravity in classical mechanics, can be seen as a prediction of general relativity for the almost flat spacetime geometry around stationary mass distributions. Some predictions of general relativity, however, are beyond Newton's law of universal gravitation in classical physics. These predictions concern the passage of time, the geometry of space, the motion of bodies in free fall, and the propagation of light, and include gravitational time dilation, gravitational lensing, the gravitational redshift of light, the Shapiro time delay, singularities and black holes. So far, all tests of general relativity have been in agreement with the theory. The time-dependent solutions of general relativity enable us to extrapolate the history of the universe into the past and future, and have provided the modern framework for cosmology, thus leading to the discovery of the Big Bang and cosmic microwave background radiation. Despite the introduction of a number of alternative theories, general relativity continues to be the simplest theory consistent with experimental data.

Reconciliation of general relativity with the laws of quantum physics remains a problem, however, as no self-consistent theory of quantum gravity has been found. It is not yet known how gravity can be unified with the three non-gravitational interactions: strong, weak and electromagnetic.

Einstein's theory has astrophysical implications, including the prediction of black holes—regions of space in which space and time are distorted in such a way that nothing, not even light, can escape from them. Black holes are the end-state for massive stars. Microquasars and active galactic nuclei are believed to be stellar black holes and supermassive black holes. It also predicts gravitational lensing, where the bending of light results in distorted and multiple images of the same distant astronomical phenomenon. Other predictions include the existence of gravitational waves, which have been observed directly by the physics collaboration LIGO and other observatories. In addition, general relativity has provided the basis for cosmological models of an expanding universe.

Widely acknowledged as a theory of extraordinary mathematical beauty, general relativity has often been described as the "most beautiful of all existing physical theories."

== History ==
Henri Poincaré's 1905 theory of the dynamics of the electron was a relativistic theory which he applied to all forces, including gravity. While others thought that gravity was instantaneous or of electromagnetic origin, he suggested that relativity was "something due to our methods of measurement". In his theory, he proposed that gravitational waves propagate at the speed of light. Soon afterwards, Einstein started thinking about how to incorporate gravity into his relativistic framework. In 1907, beginning with a simple thought experiment involving an observer in free fall (FFO), he embarked on what would be an eight-year search for a relativistic theory of gravity. After numerous detours and false starts, his work culminated in the presentation to the Prussian Academy of Science in November 1915 of what are known as the Einstein field equations, which form the core of Einstein's general theory of relativity. These equations specify how the geometry of space and time is influenced by whatever matter and radiation are present. A version of non-Euclidean geometry, called Riemannian geometry, enabled Einstein to develop general relativity by providing the key mathematical framework on which he fit his physical ideas of gravity. This idea was pointed out by mathematician Marcel Grossmann and published by Grossmann and Einstein in 1913.

The Einstein field equations are nonlinear and are considered difficult to solve. Einstein used approximation methods in working out initial predictions of the theory. But in 1916, the astrophysicist Karl Schwarzschild found the first non-trivial exact solution to the Einstein field equations, the Schwarzschild metric. This solution laid the groundwork for the description of the final stages of gravitational collapse, and the objects known today as black holes. In the same year, the first steps towards generalizing Schwarzschild's solution to electrically charged objects were taken, eventually resulting in the Reissner–Nordström solution, which is associated with electrically charged black holes. In 1917, Einstein applied his theory to the universe as a whole, initiating the field of relativistic cosmology. In line with contemporary thinking, he assumed a static universe, adding a new parameter to his original field equations—the cosmological constant—to match that observational presumption. By 1929, however, the work of Hubble and others had shown that the universe is expanding. This is readily described by the expanding cosmological solutions found by Friedmann in 1922, which do not require a cosmological constant. Lemaître used these solutions to formulate the earliest version of the Big Bang models, in which the universe has evolved from an extremely hot and dense earlier state. Einstein later declared the cosmological constant the biggest blunder of his life.

During that period, general relativity remained something of a curiosity among physical theories. It was clearly superior to Newtonian gravity, being consistent with special relativity and accounting for several effects unexplained by the Newtonian theory. Einstein showed in 1915 how his theory explained the anomalous perihelion advance of the planet Mercury without any arbitrary parameters ("fudge factors"), and in 1919 an expedition led by Eddington confirmed general relativity's prediction for the deflection of starlight by the Sun during the total solar eclipse of 29 May 1919, instantly making Einstein famous. Yet the theory remained outside the mainstream of theoretical physics and astrophysics until developments between approximately 1960 and 1975 known as the golden age of general relativity. Physicists began to understand the concept of a black hole, and to identify quasars as one of these objects' astrophysical manifestations. Ever more precise solar system tests confirmed the theory's predictive power, and relativistic cosmology also became amenable to direct observational tests.

General relativity has acquired a reputation as a theory of extraordinary beauty. Subrahmanyan Chandrasekhar has noted that at multiple levels, general relativity exhibits what Francis Bacon has termed a "strangeness in the proportion" (i.e. elements that excite wonderment and surprise). It juxtaposes fundamental concepts (space and time versus matter and motion) which had previously been considered as entirely independent. Chandrasekhar also noted that Einstein's only guides in his search for an exact theory were the principle of equivalence and his sense that a proper description of gravity should be geometrical at its basis, so that there was an "element of revelation" in the manner in which Einstein arrived at his theory. Other elements of beauty associated with the general theory of relativity are its simplicity and symmetry, the manner in which it incorporates invariance and unification, and its perfect logical consistency.

In the preface to Relativity: The Special and the General Theory, Einstein said "The present book is intended, as far as possible, to give an exact insight into the theory of Relativity to those readers who, from a general scientific and philosophical point of view, are interested in the theory, but who are not conversant with the mathematical apparatus of theoretical physics. The work presumes a standard of education corresponding to that of a university matriculation examination, and, despite the shortness of the book, a fair amount of patience and force of will on the part of the reader. The author has spared himself no pains in his endeavour to present the main ideas in the simplest and most intelligible form, and on the whole, in the sequence and connection in which they actually originated."

== From classical mechanics to general relativity ==
General relativity can be understood by examining its similarities with and departures from classical physics. The first step is the realization that classical mechanics and Newton's law of gravity admit a geometric description. The combination of this description with the laws of special relativity results in a heuristic derivation of general relativity.

=== Geometry of Newtonian gravity ===
According to general relativity, objects in a gravitational field behave similarly to objects within an accelerating enclosure. For example, an observer will see a ball fall the same way in a rocket (left) as it does on Earth (right), provided that the acceleration of the rocket is equal to 9.8 m/s^{2} (the acceleration due to gravity on the surface of the Earth).

At the base of classical mechanics is the notion that a body's motion can be described as a combination of free (or inertial) motion, and deviations from this free motion. Such deviations are caused by external forces acting on a body in accordance with Newton's second law of motion, which states that the net force acting on a body is equal to that body's (inertial) mass multiplied by its acceleration. The preferred inertial motions are related to the geometry of space and time: in the standard reference frames of classical mechanics, objects in free motion move along straight lines at constant speed. In modern parlance, their paths are geodesics, straight world lines in curved spacetime.

Conversely, one might expect that inertial motions, once identified by observing the actual motions of bodies and making allowances for the external forces (such as electromagnetism or friction), can be used to define the geometry of space, as well as a time coordinate. However, there is an ambiguity once gravity comes into play. According to Newton's law of gravity, and independently verified by experiments such as that of Eötvös and its successors (see Eötvös experiment), there is a universality of free fall (also known as the weak equivalence principle, or the universal equality of inertial and passive-gravitational mass): the trajectory of a test body in free fall depends only on its position and initial speed, but not on any of its material properties. A simplified version of this is embodied in Einstein's elevator experiment, illustrated in the figure on the right: for an observer in an enclosed room, it is impossible to decide, by mapping the trajectory of bodies such as a dropped ball, whether the room is stationary in a gravitational field and the ball accelerating, or in free space aboard a rocket that is accelerating at a rate equal to that of the gravitational field versus the ball which upon release has nil acceleration.

Given the universality of free fall, there is no observable distinction between inertial motion and motion under the influence of the gravitational force. This suggests the definition of a new class of inertial motion, namely that of objects in free fall under the influence of gravity. This new class of preferred motions, too, defines a geometry of space and time—in mathematical terms, it is the geodesic motion associated with a specific connection which depends on the gradient of the gravitational potential. Space, in this construction, still has the ordinary Euclidean geometry. However, spacetime as a whole is more complicated. As can be shown using simple thought experiments following the free-fall trajectories of different test particles, the result of transporting spacetime vectors that can denote a particle's velocity (time-like vectors) will vary with the particle's trajectory; mathematically speaking, the Newtonian connection is not integrable. From this, one can deduce that spacetime is curved. The resulting Newton–Cartan theory is a geometric formulation of Newtonian gravity using only covariant concepts, i.e. a description which is valid in any desired coordinate system. In this geometric description, tidal effects—the relative acceleration of bodies in free fall—are related to the derivative of the connection, showing how the modified geometry is caused by the presence of mass.

=== Relativistic generalization ===
Light cone of event A

As intriguing as geometric Newtonian gravity may be, its basis, classical mechanics, is merely a limiting case of (special) relativistic mechanics. In the language of symmetry: where gravity can be neglected, physics is Lorentz invariant as in special relativity rather than Galilei invariant as in classical mechanics. (The defining symmetry of special relativity is the Poincaré group, which includes translations, rotations, boosts and reflections.) The differences between the two become significant when dealing with speeds approaching the speed of light, and with high-energy phenomena.

With Lorentz symmetry, additional structures come into play. They are defined by the set of light cones (see image). The light-cones define a causal structure: for each event A, there is a set of events that can, in principle, either influence or be influenced by A via signals or interactions that do not need to travel faster than light (such as event B in the image), and a set of events for which such an influence is impossible (such as event C in the image). These sets are observer-independent. In conjunction with the world-lines of freely falling particles, the light-cones can be used to reconstruct the spacetime's semi-Riemannian metric, at least up to a positive scalar factor. In mathematical terms, this defines a conformal structure or conformal geometry.

Special relativity is defined in the absence of gravity. For practical applications, it is a suitable model whenever gravity can be neglected. Bringing gravity into play, and assuming the universality of free fall motion, an analogous reasoning as in the previous section applies: there are no global inertial frames. Instead there are approximate inertial frames moving alongside freely falling particles. Translated into the language of spacetime: the straight time-like lines that define a gravity-free inertial frame are deformed to lines that are curved relative to each other, suggesting that the inclusion of gravity necessitates a change in spacetime geometry.

A priori, it is not clear whether the new local frames in free fall coincide with the reference frames in which the laws of special relativity hold—that theory is based on the propagation of light, and thus on electromagnetism, which could have a different set of preferred frames. But using different assumptions about the special-relativistic frames (such as their being earth-fixed, or in free fall), one can derive different predictions for the gravitational redshift, that is, the way in which the frequency of light shifts as the light propagates through a gravitational field (cf. below). The actual measurements show that free-falling frames are the ones in which light propagates as it does in special relativity. The generalization of this statement, namely that the laws of special relativity hold to good approximation in freely falling (and non-rotating) reference frames, is known as the Einstein equivalence principle, a crucial guiding principle for generalizing special-relativistic physics to include gravity.

The same experimental data shows that time as measured by clocks in a gravitational field—proper time, to give the technical term—does not follow the rules of special relativity. In the language of spacetime geometry, it is not measured by the Minkowski metric. As in the Newtonian case, this is suggestive of a more general geometry. At small scales, all reference frames that are in free fall are equivalent, and approximately Minkowskian. Consequently, we are dealing with a curved generalization of Minkowski space. The metric tensor that defines the geometry—in particular, how lengths and angles are measured—is not the Minkowski metric of special relativity, it is a generalization known as a semi- or pseudo-Riemannian metric. Furthermore, each Riemannian metric is naturally associated with one particular kind of connection, the Levi-Civita connection, and this is, in fact, the connection that satisfies the equivalence principle and makes space locally Minkowskian (that is, in suitable locally inertial coordinates, the metric is Minkowskian, and its first partial derivatives and the connection coefficients vanish).

=== Einstein's equations ===
Having formulated the relativistic, geometric version of the effects of gravity, the question of gravity's source remains. In Newtonian gravity, the source is mass. In special relativity, mass turns out to be part of a more general quantity called the stress–energy tensor, which includes both energy and momentum densities as well as stress: pressure and shear. Using the equivalence principle, this tensor is readily generalized to curved spacetime. Drawing further upon the analogy with geometric Newtonian gravity, it is natural to assume that the field equation for gravity relates this tensor and the Ricci tensor, which describes a particular class of tidal effects: the change in volume for a small cloud of test particles that are initially at rest, and then fall freely. In special relativity, conservation of energy–momentum corresponds to the statement that the stress–energy tensor is divergence-free. This formula, too, is readily generalized to curved spacetime by replacing partial derivatives with their curved-manifold counterparts, covariant derivatives studied in differential geometry. With this additional condition—the covariant divergence of the stress–energy tensor, and hence of whatever is on the other side of the equation, is zero—the simplest nontrivial set of equations are what are called Einstein's (field) equations:

Einstein's field equations

$G_{\mu\nu}\equiv R_{\mu\nu} - \tfrac{1}{2}R\,g_{\mu\nu} = \kappa T_{\mu\nu}\,$

On the left-hand side is the Einstein tensor, $G_{\mu\nu}$, which is symmetric and a specific divergence-free combination of the Ricci tensor $R_{\mu\nu}$ and the metric. In particular,
$$R=g^{\mu\nu}R_{\mu\nu}$$
is the curvature scalar. The Ricci tensor itself is related to the more general Riemann curvature tensor as
$$R_{\mu\nu}={R^\alpha}_{\mu\alpha\nu}.$$

On the right-hand side, $\kappa$ is a constant and $T_{\mu\nu}$ is the stress–energy tensor. All tensors are written in abstract index notation. Matching the theory's prediction to observational results for planetary orbits or, equivalently, assuring that the weak-gravity, low-speed limit is Newtonian mechanics, the proportionality constant $\kappa$ is found to be $\kappa={8\pi G}/{c^4}$, where $G$ is the Newtonian constant of gravitation and $c$ the speed of light in vacuum. When there is no matter present, so that the stress–energy tensor vanishes, the results are the vacuum Einstein equations,
$$R_{\mu\nu}=0.$$

In general relativity, the world line of a particle free from all external, non-gravitational force is a particular type of geodesic in curved spacetime. In other words, a freely moving or falling particle always moves along a geodesic.

The geodesic equation is:
$${d^2 x^\mu \over ds^2}+\Gamma^\mu {}_{\alpha \beta}{d x^\alpha \over ds}{d x^\beta \over ds}=0,$$
where $s$ is a scalar parameter of motion (e.g. the proper time), and $\Gamma^\mu {}_{\alpha \beta}$ are Christoffel symbols (sometimes called the affine connection coefficients or Levi-Civita connection coefficients) which is symmetric in the two lower indices. Greek indices may take the values: 0, 1, 2, 3 and the summation convention is used for repeated indices $\alpha$ and $\beta$. The quantity on the left-hand-side of this equation is the acceleration of a particle, and so this equation is analogous to Newton's laws of motion which likewise provide formulae for the acceleration of a particle. This equation of motion employs the Einstein notation, meaning that repeated indices are summed (i.e. from zero to three). The Christoffel symbols are functions of the four spacetime coordinates, and so are independent of the velocity or acceleration or other characteristics of a test particle whose motion is described by the geodesic equation.

=== Total force in general relativity ===
In general relativity, the effective gravitational potential energy of an object of mass m revolving around a massive central body M is given by
$$U_f(r) =-\frac{GMm}{r}+\frac{L^{2}}{2mr^{2}}-\frac{GML^{2}}{mc^{2}r^{3}}$$

A conservative total force can then be obtained as its negative gradient
$$F_f(r)=-\frac{GMm}{r^{2}}+\frac{L^{2}}{mr^{3}}-\frac{3GML^{2}}{mc^{2}r^{4}}$$
where L is the angular momentum. The first term represents the force of Newtonian gravity, which is described by the inverse-square law. The second term represents the centrifugal force in the circular motion. The third term represents the relativistic effect.

=== Alternatives to general relativity ===
There are alternatives to general relativity built upon the same premises, which include additional rules and/or constraints, leading to different field equations. Examples are Whitehead's theory, Brans–Dicke theory, teleparallelism, f(R) gravity and Einstein–Cartan theory.

== Definition and basic applications ==
The derivation outlined in the previous section contains all the information needed to define general relativity, describe its key properties, and address a question of crucial importance in physics, namely how the theory can be used for model-building.

=== Definition and basic properties ===
General relativity is a metric theory of gravitation. At its core are Einstein's equations, which describe the relation between the geometry of a four-dimensional pseudo-Riemannian manifold representing spacetime, and the distribution of energy, momentum and stress contained in that spacetime. Phenomena that in classical mechanics are ascribed to the action of the force of gravity (such as free-fall, orbital motion, and spacecraft trajectories), correspond to inertial motion within a curved geometry of spacetime in general relativity; there is no gravitational force deflecting objects from their natural, straight paths. Instead, gravity corresponds to changes in the properties of space and time, which in turn changes the straightest-possible paths that objects will naturally follow. The curvature is, in turn, caused by the stress–energy of matter. Paraphrasing the relativist John Archibald Wheeler, spacetime tells matter how to move; matter tells spacetime how to curve.

While general relativity replaces the scalar gravitational potential of classical physics by a symmetric rank-two tensor, the latter reduces to the former in certain limiting cases. For weak gravitational fields and low speed relative to the speed of light, the theory's predictions converge on those of Newton's law of universal gravitation.

As it is constructed using tensors, general relativity exhibits general covariance: its laws—and further laws formulated within the general relativistic framework—take on the same form in all coordinate systems. Furthermore, the theory does not contain any invariant geometric background structures, i.e. it is background-independent. It thus satisfies a more stringent general principle of relativity, namely that the laws of physics are the same for all observers. Locally, as expressed in the equivalence principle, spacetime is Minkowskian, and the laws of physics exhibit local Lorentz invariance.

=== Model-building and basic applications ===
The core concept of general-relativistic model-building is that of a solution of Einstein's equations. Given both Einstein's equations and suitable equations for the properties of matter, such a solution consists of a specific semi-Riemannian manifold (usually defined by giving the metric in specific coordinates), and specific matter fields defined on that manifold. Matter and geometry must satisfy Einstein's equations, so in particular, the matter's stress–energy tensor must be divergence-free. The matter must, of course, also satisfy whatever additional equations were imposed on its properties. In short, such a solution is a model universe that satisfies the laws of general relativity, and possibly additional laws governing whatever matter might be present.

Einstein's equations are nonlinear partial differential equations and, as such, difficult to solve exactly. Nevertheless, a number of exact solutions are known, although only a few have direct physical applications. The best-known exact solutions, and also those most interesting from a physics point of view, are the Schwarzschild solution, the Reissner–Nordström solution and the Kerr metric, each corresponding to a certain type of black hole in an otherwise empty universe, and the Friedmann–Lemaître–Robertson–Walker and de Sitter universes, each describing an expanding cosmos. Exact solutions of great theoretical interest include the Gödel universe (which opens up the intriguing possibility of time travel in curved spacetimes), the Taub–NUT solution (a model universe that is homogeneous, but anisotropic), and anti-de Sitter space (which has recently come to prominence in the context of what is called the Maldacena conjecture).

Given the difficulty of finding exact solutions, Einstein's field equations are also solved frequently by numerical integration on a computer, or by considering small perturbations of exact solutions. In the field of numerical relativity, powerful computers are employed to simulate the geometry of spacetime and to solve Einstein's equations for interesting situations such as two colliding black holes. In principle, such methods may be applied to any system, given sufficient computer resources, and may address fundamental questions such as naked singularities. Approximate solutions may also be found by perturbation theories such as linearized gravity and its generalization, the post-Newtonian expansion, both of which were developed by Einstein. The latter provides a systematic approach to solving for the geometry of a spacetime that contains a distribution of matter that moves slowly compared with the speed of light. The expansion involves a series of terms; the first terms represent Newtonian gravity, whereas the later terms represent ever smaller corrections to Newton's theory due to general relativity. An extension of this expansion is the parametrized post-Newtonian (PPN) formalism, which allows quantitative comparisons between the predictions of general relativity and alternative theories.

== Consequences of Einstein's theory ==
General relativity has a number of physical consequences. Some follow directly from the theory's axioms, whereas others have become clear only in the course of many years of research that followed Einstein's initial publication.

=== Gravitational time dilation and frequency shift ===
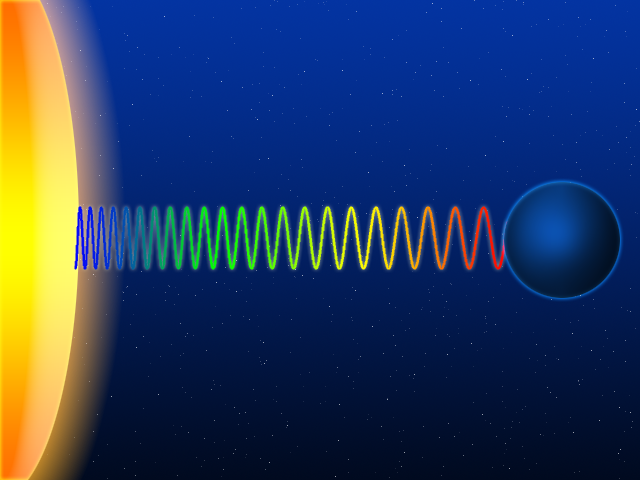
Schematic representation of the gravitational redshift of a light wave escaping from the surface of a massive body

Assuming that the equivalence principle holds, gravity influences the passage of time. Light sent down into a gravity well is blueshifted, whereas light sent in the opposite direction (i.e., climbing out of the gravity well) is redshifted; collectively, these two effects are known as the gravitational frequency shift. More generally, processes close to a massive body run more slowly when compared with processes taking place farther away; this effect is known as gravitational time dilation.

Gravitational redshift has been measured in the laboratory and using astronomical observations. Gravitational time dilation in the Earth's gravitational field has been measured numerous times using atomic clocks, while ongoing validation is provided as a side effect of the operation of the Global Positioning System (GPS). Tests in stronger gravitational fields are provided by the observation of binary pulsars. All results are in agreement with general relativity. However, at the existing level of accuracy, these observations cannot distinguish between general relativity and other theories in which the equivalence principle is valid.

In the vicinity of a non-rotating sphere, the time dilation due to gravity, derived from the Schwarzschild metric, is
$$t_0 = t_f \sqrt{1 - \frac{2GM}{rc^2}}$$
where

- $t_0$ is the proper time between two events for an observer close to the massive sphere, i.e. deep within the gravitational field
- $t_f$ is the coordinate time between the events for an observer at an arbitrarily large distance from the massive object (this assumes the far-away observer is using Schwarzschild coordinates, a coordinate system where a clock at infinite distance from the massive sphere would tick at one second per second of coordinate time, while closer clocks would tick at less than that rate),
- $G$ is the gravitational constant,
- $M$ is the mass of the object creating the gravitational field,
- $r$ is the radial coordinate of the observer within the gravitational field (this coordinate is analogous to the classical distance from the center of the object, but is actually a Schwarzschild coordinate; the equation in this form has real solutions for $r > r_{\rm s}$), $r_\text{s} = \frac{2 G M}{c^2}$,
- $c$ is the speed of light.

=== Light deflection and gravitational time delay ===
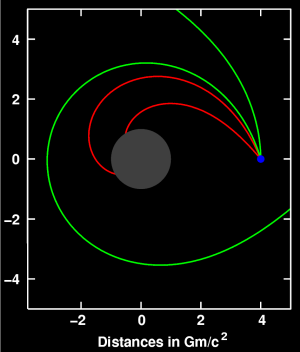
Deflection of light (sent out from the location shown in blue) near a compact body (shown in gray)

General relativity predicts that the path of light will follow the curvature of spacetime as it passes near a massive object. This effect was initially confirmed by observing the light of stars or distant quasars being deflected as it passes the Sun.

This and related predictions follow from the fact that light follows what is called a light-like or null geodesic—a generalization of the straight lines along which light travels in classical physics. Such geodesics are the generalization of the invariance of lightspeed in special relativity. As one examines suitable model spacetimes (either the exterior Schwarzschild solution or, for more than a single mass, the post-Newtonian expansion), several effects of gravity on light propagation emerge. Although the bending of light can also be derived by extending the universality of free fall to light, the angle of deflection resulting from such calculations is only half the value given by general relativity.

Closely related to light deflection is the Shapiro time delay, the phenomenon that light signals take longer to move through a gravitational field than they would in the absence of that field. There have been numerous successful tests of this prediction. In the parameterized post-Newtonian formalism (PPN), measurements of both the deflection of light and the gravitational time delay determine a parameter called γ, which encodes the influence of gravity on the geometry of space.

=== Gravitational waves ===
Ring of test particles deformed by a passing (linearized, amplified for better visibility) gravitational wave

Predicted in 1916 by Albert Einstein, there are gravitational waves: ripples in the metric of spacetime that propagate at the speed of light. These are one of several analogies between weak-field gravity and electromagnetism in that, they are analogous to electromagnetic waves. On 11 February 2016, the Advanced LIGO team announced that they had directly detected gravitational waves from a pair of black holes merging.

The simplest type of such a wave can be visualized by its action on a ring of freely floating particles. A sine wave propagating through such a ring towards the reader distorts the ring in a characteristic, rhythmic fashion (animated image to the right). Since Einstein's equations are non-linear, arbitrarily strong gravitational waves do not obey linear superposition, making their description difficult. However, linear approximations of gravitational waves are sufficiently accurate to describe the exceedingly weak waves that are expected to arrive here on Earth from far-off cosmic events, which typically result in relative distances increasing and decreasing by 10^{−21} or less. Data analysis methods routinely make use of the fact that these linearized waves can be Fourier decomposed.

Some exact solutions describe gravitational waves without any approximation, e.g., a wave train traveling through empty space or Gowdy universes, varieties of an expanding cosmos filled with gravitational waves. But for gravitational waves produced in astrophysically relevant situations, such as the merger of two black holes, numerical methods are the only way to construct appropriate models.

=== Orbital effects and the relativity of direction ===
General relativity differs from classical mechanics in a number of predictions concerning orbiting bodies. It predicts an overall rotation (precession) of planetary orbits, as well as orbital decay caused by the emission of gravitational waves and effects related to the relativity of direction.

==== Precession of apsides ====
Newtonian (red) vs. Einsteinian orbit (blue) of a lone planet orbiting a star. The influence of other planets is ignored.

In general relativity, the apsides of any orbit (the point of the orbiting body's closest approach to the system's center of mass) will precess; the orbit is not an ellipse, but akin to an ellipse that rotates on its focus, resulting in a rose curve-like shape (see image). Einstein first derived this result by using an approximate metric representing the Newtonian limit and treating the orbiting body as a test particle. For him, the fact that his theory gave a straightforward explanation of Mercury's anomalous perihelion shift, discovered earlier by Urbain Le Verrier in 1859, was important evidence that he had at last identified the correct form of the gravitational field equations.

The effect can also be derived by using either the exact Schwarzschild metric (describing spacetime around a spherical mass) or the much more general post-Newtonian formalism. It is due to the influence of gravity on the geometry of space and to the contribution of self-energy to a body's gravity (encoded in the nonlinearity of Einstein's equations). Relativistic precession has been observed for all planets that allow for accurate precession measurements (Mercury, Venus, and Earth), as well as in binary pulsar systems, where it is larger by five orders of magnitude.

In general relativity the perihelion shift $\sigma$, expressed in radians per revolution, is approximately given by:
$$\sigma=\frac {24\pi^3L^2} {T^2c^2(1-e^2)} \ ,$$
where:

- $L$ is the semi-major axis
- $T$ is the orbital period
- $c$ is the speed of light in a vacuum
- $e$ is the orbital eccentricity

==== Orbital decay ====
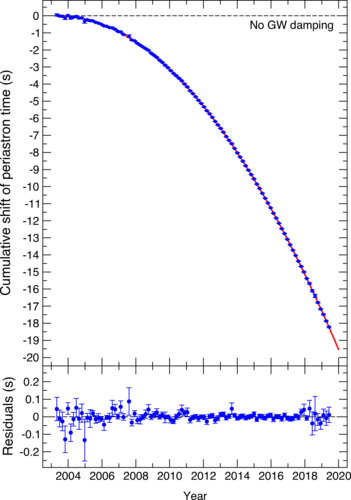
Orbital decay for PSR J0737−3039: time shift, tracked over 16 years (2021).

According to general relativity, a binary system will emit gravitational waves, thereby losing energy. Due to this loss, the distance between the two orbiting bodies decreases, and so does their orbital period. Within the Solar System or for ordinary double stars, the effect is too small to be observable. This is not the case for a close binary pulsar, a system of two orbiting neutron stars, one of which is a pulsar: from the pulsar, observers on Earth receive a regular series of radio pulses that can serve as a highly accurate clock, which allows precise measurements of the orbital period. Because neutron stars are immensely compact, significant amounts of energy are emitted in the form of gravitational radiation.

The first observation of a decrease in orbital period due to the emission of gravitational waves was made by Hulse and Taylor, using the binary pulsar PSR1913+16 they had discovered in 1974. This was the first detection of gravitational waves, albeit indirect, for which they were awarded the 1993 Nobel Prize in physics. Since then, several other binary pulsars have been found, in particular the double pulsar PSR J0737−3039, where both stars are pulsars and which was last reported to also be in agreement with general relativity in 2021 after 16 years of observations.

==== Geodetic precession and frame-dragging ====
Several relativistic effects are directly related to the relativity of direction. One is geodetic precession: the axis direction of a gyroscope in free fall in curved spacetime will change when compared, for instance, with the direction of light received from distant stars—even though such a gyroscope represents the way of keeping a direction as stable as possible ("parallel transport"). For the Moon–Earth system, this effect has been measured with the help of lunar laser ranging. More recently, it has been measured for test masses aboard the satellite Gravity Probe B to a precision of better than 0.3%.

Near a rotating mass, there are gravitomagnetic or frame-dragging effects. A distant observer will determine that objects close to the mass get "dragged around". This is most extreme for rotating black holes where, for any object entering a zone known as the ergosphere, rotation is inevitable. Such effects can again be tested through their influence on the orientation of gyroscopes in free fall. Somewhat controversial tests have been performed using the LAGEOS satellites, confirming the relativistic prediction. Also the Mars Global Surveyor probe around Mars has been used.

== Astrophysical applications ==
=== Gravitational lensing ===
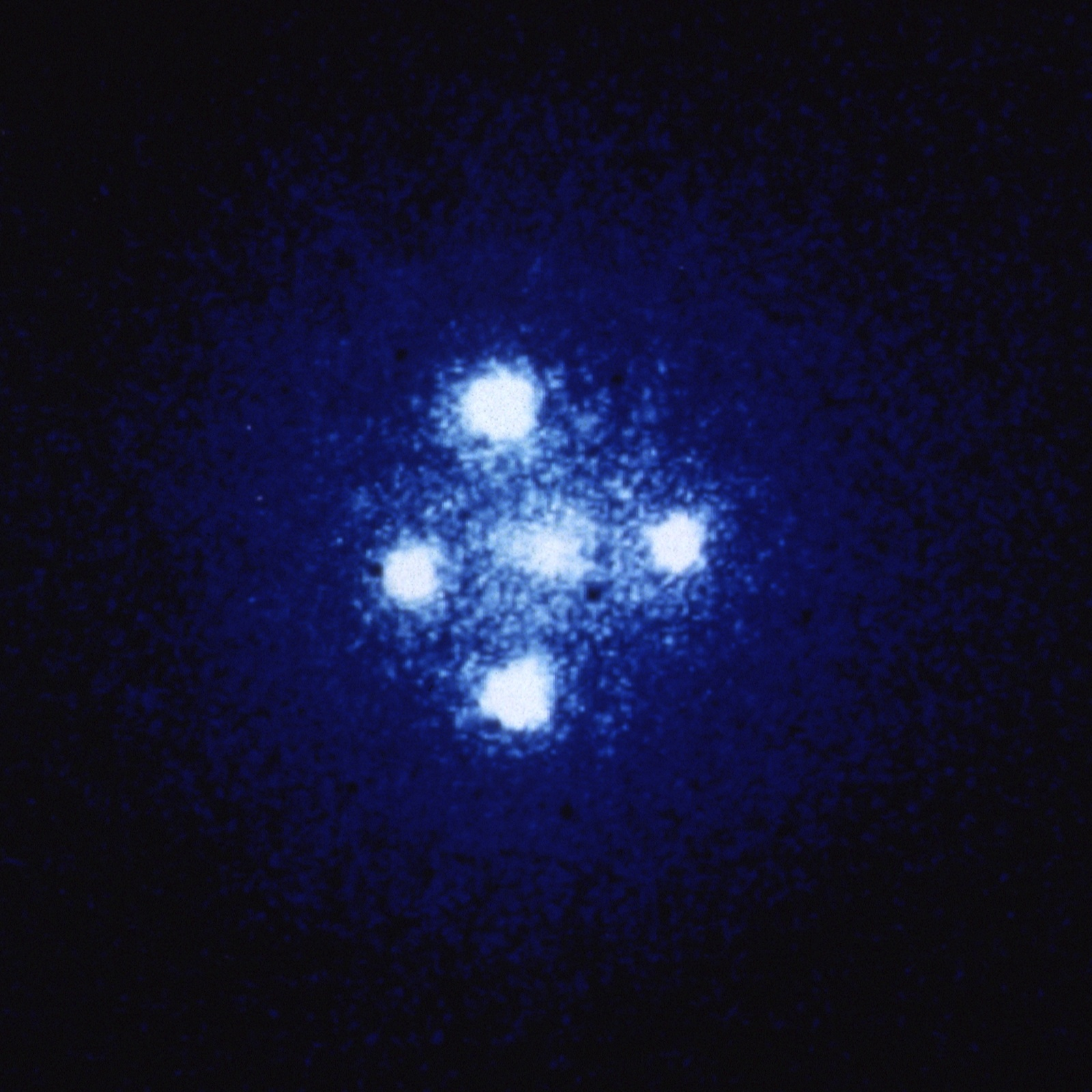
Einstein cross: four images of the same astronomical object, produced by a gravitational lens

The deflection of light by gravity is responsible for a new class of astronomical phenomena. If a massive object is situated between the astronomer and a distant target object with appropriate mass and relative distances, the astronomer will see multiple distorted images of the target. Such effects are known as gravitational lensing. Depending on the configuration, scale, and mass distribution, there can be two or more images, a bright ring known as an Einstein ring, or partial rings called arcs. The earliest example was discovered in 1979; since then, more than a hundred gravitational lenses have been observed. Even if the multiple images are too close to each other to be resolved, the effect can still be measured, e.g., as an overall brightening of the target object; a number of such "microlensing events" have been observed.

Gravitational lensing has developed into a tool of observational astronomy. It is used to detect the presence and distribution of dark matter, provide a "natural telescope" for observing distant galaxies, and to obtain an independent estimate of the Hubble constant. Statistical evaluations of lensing data provide valuable insight into the structural evolution of galaxies.

=== Gravitational-wave astronomy ===
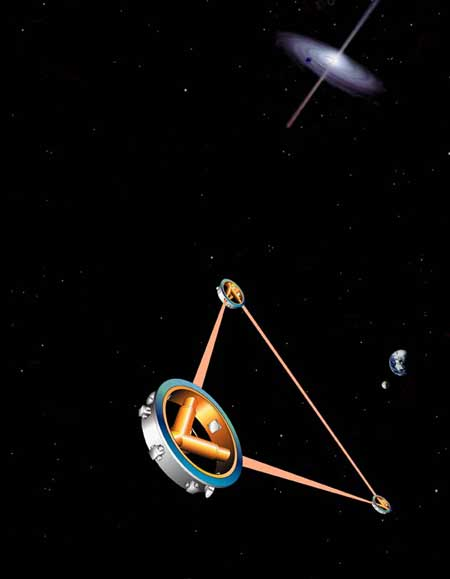
Artist's impression of the space-borne gravitational wave detector LISA

Observations of binary pulsars provide strong indirect evidence for the existence of gravitational waves (see Orbital decay, above). Detection of these waves is a major goal of contemporary relativity-related research. Several land-based gravitational wave detectors are in operation, for example the interferometric detectors GEO 600, LIGO (two detectors), TAMA 300 and VIRGO. Various pulsar timing arrays are using millisecond pulsars to detect gravitational waves in the 10^{−9} to 10^{−6} hertz frequency range, which originate from binary supermassive black holes. A European space-based detector, eLISA / NGO, is under development, with a precursor mission (LISA Pathfinder) having launched in December 2015.

Observations of gravitational waves promise to complement observations in the electromagnetic spectrum. They are expected to yield information about black holes and other dense objects such as neutron stars and white dwarfs, about certain kinds of supernova implosions, and about processes in the very early universe, including the signature of certain types of hypothetical cosmic string. In February 2016, the Advanced LIGO team announced that they had detected gravitational waves from a black hole merger.

=== Black holes and other compact objects ===
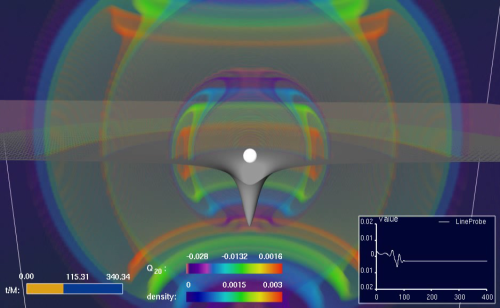
Simulation based on the equations of general relativity: a star collapsing to form a black hole while emitting gravitational waves

Whenever the ratio of an object's mass to its radius becomes sufficiently large, general relativity predicts the formation of a black hole, a region of space from which nothing, not even light, can escape. In the accepted models of stellar evolution, neutron stars of around 1.4 solar masses, and stellar black holes with a few to a few dozen solar masses, are thought to be the final state for the evolution of massive stars. Usually a galaxy has one supermassive black hole with a few million to a few billion solar masses in its center, and its presence is thought to have played an important role in the formation of the galaxy and larger cosmic structures.

Astronomically, the most important property of compact objects is that they provide a supremely efficient mechanism for converting gravitational energy into electromagnetic radiation. Accretion, the falling of dust or gaseous matter onto stellar or supermassive black holes, is thought to be responsible for some spectacularly luminous astronomical objects, especially diverse kinds of active galactic nuclei on galactic scales and stellar-size objects such as microquasars. In particular, accretion can lead to relativistic jets, focused beams of highly energetic particles that are being flung into space at almost light speed. General relativity plays a central role in modelling all these phenomena, and observations provide strong evidence for the existence of black holes with the properties predicted by the theory.

Black holes are also sought-after targets in the search for gravitational waves (cf. section § Gravitational waves, above). Merging black hole binaries should lead to some of the strongest gravitational wave signals reaching detectors on Earth, and the phase directly before the merger ("chirp") could be used as a "standard candle" to deduce the distance to the merger events–and hence serve as a probe of cosmic expansion at large distances. The gravitational waves produced as a stellar black hole plunges into a supermassive one should provide direct information about the supermassive black hole's geometry.

=== Cosmology ===
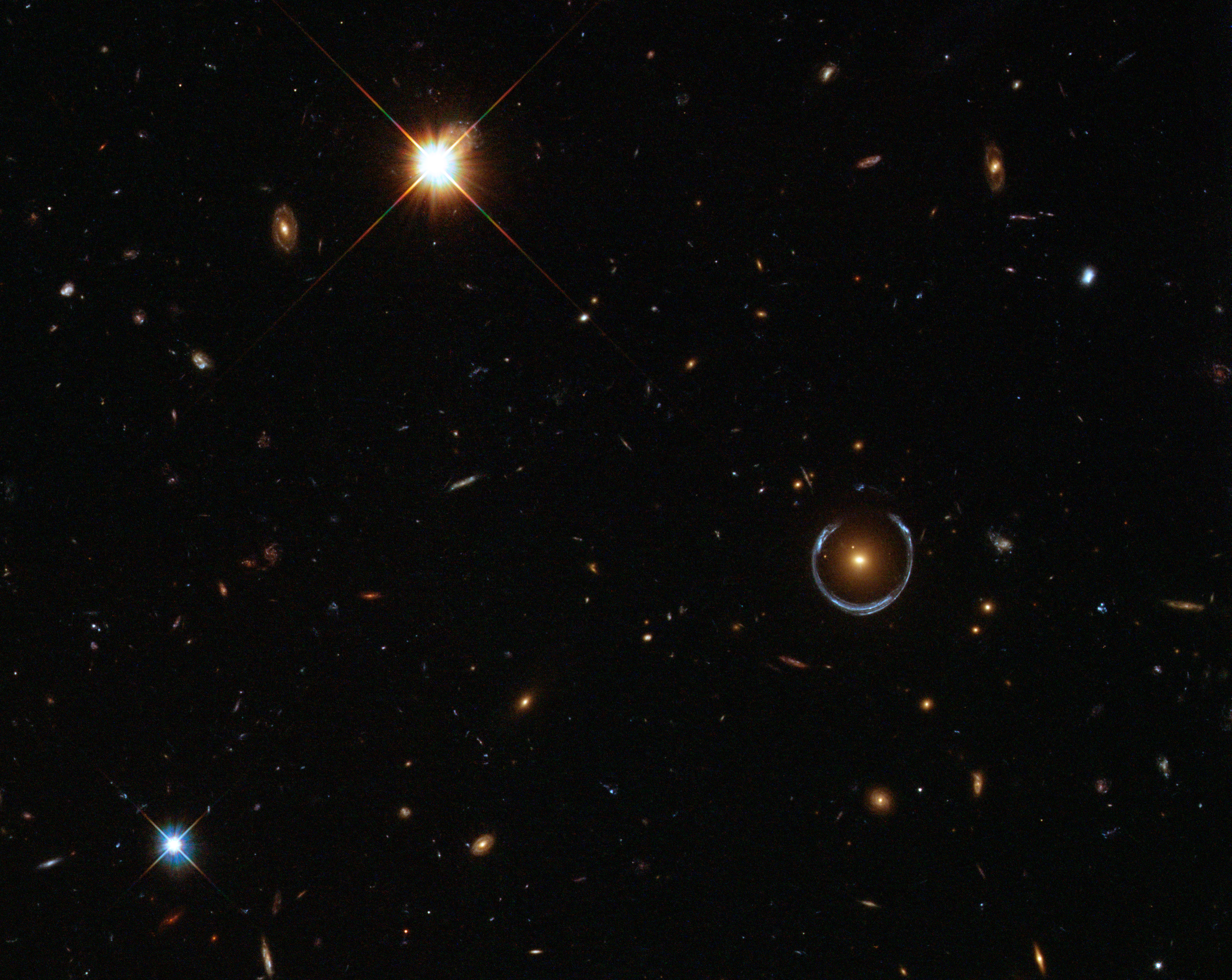
This blue horseshoe is a distant galaxy that has been magnified and warped into a nearly complete ring by the strong gravitational pull of the massive foreground luminous red galaxy.

The existing models of cosmology are based on Einstein's field equations, which include the cosmological constant $\Lambda$ since it has important influence on the large-scale dynamics of the cosmos,
$$R_{\mu\nu} - {\textstyle 1 \over 2}R\,g_{\mu\nu} + \Lambda\ g_{\mu\nu} = \frac{8\pi G}{c^{4}}\, T_{\mu\nu}$$
where $g_{\mu\nu}$ is the spacetime metric. Isotropic and homogeneous solutions of these enhanced equations, the Friedmann–Lemaître–Robertson–Walker solutions, allow physicists to model a universe that has evolved over the past 14 billion years from a hot, early Big Bang phase. Once a small number of parameters (for example the universe's mean matter density) have been fixed by astronomical observation, further observational data can be used to put the models to the test. Predictions, all successful, include the initial abundance of chemical elements formed in a period of primordial nucleosynthesis, the large-scale structure of the universe, and the existence and properties of a "thermal echo" from the early cosmos, the cosmic background radiation.

Astronomical observations of the cosmological expansion rate allow the total amount of matter in the universe to be estimated, although the nature of that matter remains mysterious in part. About 90% of all matter appears to be dark matter, which has mass (or, equivalently, gravitational influence), but does not interact electromagnetically and, hence, cannot be observed directly. There is no generally accepted description of this new kind of matter, within the framework of known particle physics or otherwise. Observational evidence from redshift surveys of distant supernovae and measurements of the cosmic background radiation also show that the evolution of the universe is significantly influenced by a cosmological constant resulting in an acceleration of cosmic expansion or, equivalently, by a form of energy with an unusual equation of state, known as dark energy, the nature of which remains unclear.

An inflationary phase, an additional phase of strongly accelerated expansion at cosmic times of around 10^{−33} seconds, was hypothesized in 1980 to account for several puzzling observations that were unexplained by classical cosmological models, such as the nearly perfect homogeneity of the cosmic background radiation. Recent measurements of the cosmic background radiation have resulted in the first evidence for this scenario. However, there are a bewildering variety of possible inflationary scenarios, which cannot be restricted by existing observations. An even larger question is the physics of the earliest universe, prior to the inflationary phase and close to where the classical models predict the big bang singularity. An authoritative answer would require a complete theory of quantum gravity, which has not yet been developed (cf. the section on quantum gravity, below).

=== Exotic solutions: time travel, warp drives ===
Kurt Gödel showed that solutions to Einstein's equations exist that contain closed timelike curves (CTCs), which allow for loops in time. The solutions require extreme physical conditions unlikely ever to occur in practice, and it remains an open question whether further laws of physics will eliminate them completely. Since then, other—similarly impractical—GR solutions containing CTCs have been found, such as the Tipler cylinder and traversable wormholes. Stephen Hawking introduced chronology protection conjecture, which is an assumption beyond those of standard general relativity to prevent time travel.

Some exact solutions in general relativity such as Alcubierre drive offer examples of warp drive but these solutions require exotic matter distribution, and generally suffer from semiclassical instability.

== Advanced concepts ==
=== Asymptotic symmetries ===
The spacetime symmetry group for special relativity is the Poincaré group, which is a ten-dimensional group of three Lorentz boosts, three rotations, and four spacetime translations. It is logical to ask what symmetries, if any, might apply in General Relativity. A tractable case might be to consider the symmetries of spacetime as seen by observers located far away from all sources of the gravitational field. The naive expectation for asymptotically flat spacetime symmetries might be simply to extend and reproduce the symmetries of flat spacetime of special relativity, viz., the Poincaré group.

In 1962 Hermann Bondi, M. G. van der Burg, A. W. Metzner and Rainer K. Sachs addressed this asymptotic symmetry problem in order to investigate the flow of energy at infinity due to propagating gravitational waves. Their first step was to decide on some physically sensible boundary conditions to place on the gravitational field at light-like infinity to characterize what it means to say a metric is asymptotically flat, making no a priori assumptions about the nature of the asymptotic symmetry group—not even the assumption that such a group exists. Then after designing what they considered to be the most sensible boundary conditions, they investigated the nature of the resulting asymptotic symmetry transformations that leave invariant the form of the boundary conditions appropriate for asymptotically flat gravitational fields. What they found was that the asymptotic symmetry transformations actually do form a group and the structure of this group does not depend on the particular gravitational field that happens to be present. This means that, as expected, one can separate the kinematics of spacetime from the dynamics of the gravitational field at least at spatial infinity. The puzzling surprise in 1962 was their discovery of a rich infinite-dimensional group (the so-called BMS group) as the asymptotic symmetry group, instead of the finite-dimensional Poincaré group, which is a subgroup of the BMS group. Not only are the Lorentz transformations asymptotic symmetry transformations, there are also additional transformations that are not Lorentz transformations but are asymptotic symmetry transformations. In fact, they found an additional infinity of transformation generators known as supertranslations. This implies the conclusion that General Relativity (GR) does not reduce to special relativity in the case of weak fields at long distances. It turns out that the BMS symmetry, suitably modified, could be seen as a restatement of the universal soft graviton theorem in quantum field theory (QFT), which relates universal infrared (soft) QFT with GR asymptotic spacetime symmetries.

=== Causal structure and global geometry ===
Penrose–Carter diagram of an infinite Minkowski universe

In general relativity, no material body can catch up with or overtake a light pulse. No influence from an event A can reach any other location X before light sent out at A to X. In consequence, an exploration of all light worldlines (null geodesics) yields key information about the spacetime's causal structure. This structure can be displayed using Penrose–Carter diagrams in which infinitely large regions of space and infinite time intervals are shrunk ("compactified") so as to fit onto a finite map, while light still travels along diagonals as in standard spacetime diagrams.

Aware of the importance of causal structure, Roger Penrose and others developed what is known as global geometry. In global geometry, the object of study is not one particular solution (or family of solutions) to Einstein's equations. Rather, relations that hold true for all geodesics, such as the Raychaudhuri equation, and additional non-specific assumptions about the nature of matter (usually in the form of energy conditions) are used to derive general results.

=== Event horizons ===
Using global geometry, some spacetimes can be shown to contain boundaries called horizons, which demarcate one region from the rest of spacetime. The best-known examples are black holes: if mass is compressed into a sufficiently compact region of space (as specified in the hoop conjecture, the relevant length scale is the Schwarzschild radius, given by the equation $r_\text{s} = \frac{2 G M}{c^2} ,$), no light from inside can escape to the outside. Since no object can overtake a light pulse, all interior matter is imprisoned as well. Passage from the exterior to the interior is still possible, showing that the boundary, the black hole's horizon, is not a physical barrier.

The ergosphere of a rotating black hole, which plays a key role when it comes to extracting energy from such a black hole

Early studies of black holes relied on explicit solutions of Einstein's equations, notably the spherically symmetric Schwarzschild solution (used to describe a static black hole) and the axisymmetric Kerr solution (used to describe a rotating, stationary black hole, and introducing interesting features such as the ergosphere). Using global geometry, later studies have revealed more general properties of black holes. With time they become rather simple objects characterized by eleven parameters specifying: electric charge, mass–energy, linear momentum, angular momentum, and location at a specified time. This is stated by the black hole uniqueness theorem: "black holes have no hair", that is, no distinguishing marks like the hairstyles of humans. Irrespective of the complexity of a gravitating object collapsing to form a black hole, the object that results (having emitted gravitational waves) is very simple.

Even more remarkably, there is a general set of laws known as black hole mechanics, which is analogous to the laws of thermodynamics. For instance, by the second law of black hole mechanics, the area of the event horizon of a general black hole will never decrease with time, analogous to the entropy of a thermodynamic system. This limits the energy that can be extracted by classical means from a rotating black hole (e.g. by the Penrose process). There is strong evidence that the laws of black hole mechanics are, in fact, a subset of the laws of thermodynamics, and that the black hole area is proportional to its entropy. This leads to a modification of the original laws of black hole mechanics: for instance, as the second law of black hole mechanics becomes part of the second law of thermodynamics, it is possible for the black hole area to decrease as long as other processes ensure that entropy increases overall. As thermodynamical objects with nonzero temperature, black holes should emit thermal radiation. Semiclassical calculations indicate that indeed they do, with the surface gravity playing the role of temperature in Planck's law. This radiation is known as Hawking radiation (cf. the quantum theory section, below).

There are many other types of horizons. In an expanding universe, an observer may find that some regions of the past cannot be observed ("particle horizon"), and some regions of the future cannot be influenced (event horizon). Even in flat Minkowski space, when described by an accelerated observer (Rindler space), there will be horizons associated with a semiclassical radiation known as Unruh radiation.

=== Singularities ===
Another general feature of general relativity is the appearance of spacetime boundaries known as singularities. Spacetime can be explored by following up on timelike and lightlike geodesics—all possible ways that light and particles in free fall can travel. But some solutions of Einstein's equations have "ragged edges"—regions known as spacetime singularities, where the paths of light and falling particles come to an abrupt end, and geometry becomes ill-defined. In the more interesting cases, these are "curvature singularities", where geometrical quantities characterizing spacetime curvature, such as the Ricci scalar, take on infinite values. Well-known examples of spacetimes with future singularities—where worldlines end—are the Schwarzschild solution, which describes a singularity inside an eternal static black hole, or the Kerr solution with its ring-shaped singularity inside an eternal rotating black hole. The Friedmann–Lemaître–Robertson–Walker solutions and other spacetimes describing universes have past singularities on which worldlines begin, namely Big Bang singularities, and some have future singularities (Big Crunch) as well.

Given that these examples are all highly symmetric—and thus simplified—it is tempting to conclude that the occurrence of singularities is an artifact of idealization. The famous singularity theorems, proved using the methods of global geometry, say otherwise: singularities are a generic feature of general relativity, and unavoidable once the collapse of an object with realistic matter properties has proceeded beyond a certain stage and also at the beginning of a wide class of expanding universes. However, the theorems say little about the properties of singularities, and much of current research is devoted to characterizing these entities' generic structure (hypothesized e.g. by the BKL conjecture). The cosmic censorship hypothesis states that all realistic future singularities (no perfect symmetries, matter with realistic properties) are safely hidden away behind a horizon, and thus invisible to all distant observers. While no formal proof yet exists, numerical simulations offer supporting evidence of its validity.

=== Evolution equations ===
Each solution of Einstein's equation encompasses the whole history of a universe—it is not just some snapshot of how things are, but a whole, possibly matter-filled, spacetime. It describes the state of matter and geometry everywhere and at every moment in that particular universe. Due to its general covariance, Einstein's theory is not sufficient by itself to determine the time evolution of the metric tensor. It must be combined with a coordinate condition, which is analogous to gauge fixing in other field theories.

To understand Einstein's equations as partial differential equations, it is helpful to formulate them in a way that describes the evolution of the universe over time. This is done in "3+1" formulations, where spacetime is split into three space dimensions and one time dimension. The best-known example is the ADM formalism. These decompositions show that the spacetime evolution equations of general relativity are well-behaved: solutions always exist, and are uniquely defined, once suitable initial conditions have been specified. Such formulations of Einstein's field equations are the basis of numerical relativity.

=== Global and quasi-local quantities ===
The notion of evolution equations is intimately tied in with another aspect of general relativistic physics. In Einstein's theory, it turns out to be impossible to find a general definition for a seemingly simple property such as a system's total mass (or energy). The main reason is that the gravitational field—like any physical field—must be ascribed a certain energy, but that it proves to be fundamentally impossible to localize that energy.

Nevertheless, there are possibilities to define a system's total mass, either using a hypothetical "infinitely distant observer" (ADM mass) or suitable symmetries (Komar mass). If one excludes from the system's total mass the energy being carried away to infinity by gravitational waves, the result is the Bondi mass at null infinity. Just as in classical physics, it can be shown that these masses are positive. Corresponding global definitions exist for momentum and angular momentum. There have also been a number of attempts to define quasi-local quantities, such as the mass of an isolated system formulated using only quantities defined within a finite region of space containing that system. The hope is to obtain a quantity useful for general statements about isolated systems, such as a more precise formulation of the hoop conjecture.

== Relationship with quantum theory ==
If general relativity were considered to be one of the two pillars of modern physics, then quantum theory, the basis of understanding matter from elementary particles to solid-state physics, would be the other. However, how to reconcile quantum theory with general relativity is still an open question.

=== Quantum field theory in curved spacetime ===
Ordinary quantum field theories, which form the basis of modern elementary particle physics, are defined in flat Minkowski space, which is an excellent approximation when it comes to describing the behavior of microscopic particles in weak gravitational fields like those found on Earth. In order to describe situations in which gravity is strong enough to influence (quantum) matter, yet not strong enough to require quantization itself, physicists have formulated quantum field theories in curved spacetime. These theories rely on general relativity to describe a curved background spacetime, and define a generalized quantum field theory to describe the behavior of quantum matter within that spacetime. Using this formalism, it can be shown that black holes emit a blackbody spectrum of particles known as Hawking radiation leading to the possibility that they evaporate over time. As briefly mentioned above, this radiation plays an important role for the thermodynamics of black holes.

=== Quantum gravity ===
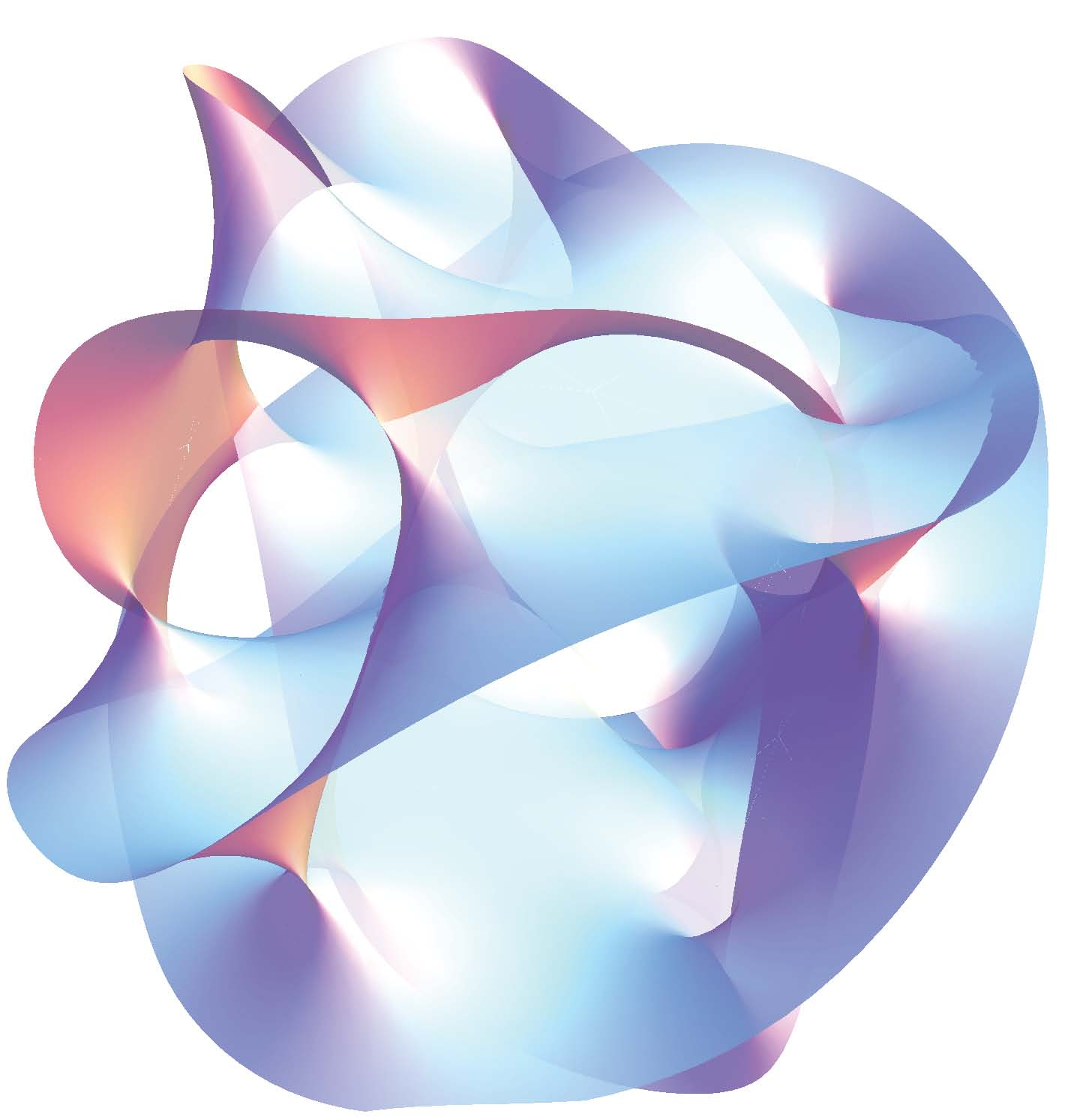
Projection of a Calabi–Yau manifold, one of the ways of compactifying the extra dimensions posited by string theory

The demand for consistency between a quantum description of matter and a geometric description of spacetime, as well as the appearance of singularities (where curvature length scales become microscopic), indicate the need for a full theory of quantum gravity: for an adequate description of the interior of black holes, and of the very early universe, a theory is required in which gravity and the associated geometry of spacetime are described in the language of quantum physics. Despite major efforts, no complete and consistent theory of quantum gravity is currently known, even though a number of candidates exist.

Attempts to generalize ordinary quantum field theories, used in elementary particle physics to describe fundamental interactions, so as to include gravity have led to serious problems. Some have argued that at low energies, this approach proves successful, in that it results in an acceptable effective (quantum) field theory of gravity. At very high energies, however, the perturbative results are badly divergent and lead to models devoid of predictive power ("perturbative non-renormalizability").

Simple spin network of the type used in loop quantum gravity

One attempt to overcome these limitations is string theory, a quantum theory not of point particles, but of minute one-dimensional extended objects. The theory promises to be a unified description of all particles and interactions, including gravity; the price to pay is unusual features such as six extra dimensions of space in addition to the usual three. In what is called the second superstring revolution, it was conjectured that both string theory and a unification of general relativity and supersymmetry known as supergravity form part of a hypothesized eleven-dimensional model known as M-theory, which would constitute a uniquely defined and consistent theory of quantum gravity.

Another approach starts with the canonical quantization procedures of quantum theory. Using the initial-value-formulation of general relativity (cf. evolution equations above), the result is the Wheeler–deWitt equation (an analogue of the Schrödinger equation) which turns out to be ill-defined without a proper ultraviolet (lattice) cutoff. However, with the introduction of what are now known as Ashtekar variables, this leads to a model known as loop quantum gravity. Space is represented by a web-like structure called a spin network, evolving over time in discrete steps.

Depending on which features of general relativity and quantum theory are accepted unchanged, and on what level changes are introduced, there are numerous other attempts to arrive at a viable theory of quantum gravity, some examples being the lattice theory of gravity based on the Feynman Path Integral approach and Regge calculus, dynamical triangulations, causal sets, twistor models or the path integral based models of quantum cosmology.

Observation of gravitational waves from binary black hole merger GW150914

All candidate theories still have major formal and conceptual problems to overcome. They also face the common problem that, as yet, there is no way to put quantum gravity predictions to experimental tests (and thus to decide between the candidates where their predictions vary), although there is hope for this to change as future data from cosmological observations and particle physics experiments becomes available.

== Current status ==
General relativity has emerged as a highly successful model of gravitation and cosmology, which has so far unambiguously fitted observational and experimental data. However, there are strong theoretical reasons to consider the theory to be incomplete. The problem of quantum gravity and the question of the reality of spacetime singularities remain open. Observational data that is taken as evidence for dark energy and dark matter could also indicate the need to consider alternatives or modifications of general relativity.

Even taken as is, general relativity provides many possibilities for further exploration. Mathematical relativists seek to understand the nature of singularities and the fundamental properties of Einstein's equations, while numerical relativists run increasingly powerful computer simulations, such as those describing merging black holes. In February 2016, it was announced that gravitational waves were directly detected by the Advanced LIGO team on 14 September 2015. A century after its introduction, general relativity remains a highly active area of research.

== See also ==
- Alcubierre drive – Hypothetical FTL transportation by warping space (warp drive)
- Alternatives to general relativity – Proposed theories of gravity
- Contributors to general relativity
- Derivations of the Lorentz transformations
- Ehrenfest paradox – Paradox in special relativity
- Einstein–Hilbert action – Concept in general relativity
- Einstein's thought experiments – Albert Einstein's hypothetical situations to argue scientific points
- General relativity priority dispute – Debate about credit for general relativity
- Introduction to the mathematics of general relativity
- Nordström's theory of gravitation – Predecessor to the theory of relativity
- Ricci calculus – Tensor index notation for tensor-based calculations
- Timeline of gravitational physics and relativity

== Bibliography ==
- Alpher, R. A.; Herman, R. C. (1948), "Evolution of the universe", Nature, 162 (4124): 774–775, Bibcode:1948Natur.162..774A, doi:10.1038/162774b0, S2CID 4113488
- Anderson, J. D.; Campbell, J. K.; Jurgens, R. F.; Lau, E. L. (1992), "Recent developments in solar-system tests of general relativity", in Sato, H.; Nakamura, T. (eds.), Proceedings of the Sixth Marcel Grossmann Meeting on General Relativity, World Scientific, pp. 353–355, ISBN 978-981-02-0950-6
- Arnold, V. I. (1989), Mathematical Methods of Classical Mechanics, Springer, ISBN 978-3-540-96890-0
- Arnowitt, Richard; Deser, Stanley; Misner, Charles W. (1962), "The dynamics of general relativity", in Witten, Louis (ed.), Gravitation: An Introduction to Current Research, Wiley, pp. 227–265
- Arun, K.G.; Blanchet, L.; Iyer, B. R.; Qusailah, M. S. S. (2008), "Inspiralling compact binaries in quasi-elliptical orbits: The complete 3PN energy flux", Physical Review D, 77 (6) 064035, arXiv:0711.0302, Bibcode:2008PhRvD..77f4035A, doi:10.1103/PhysRevD.77.064035, S2CID 55825202
- Ashby, Neil (2002), "Relativity and the Global Positioning System" (PDF), Physics Today, 55 (5): 41–47, Bibcode:2002PhT....55e..41A, doi:10.1063/1.1485583
- Ashby, Neil (2003), "Relativity in the Global Positioning System", Living Reviews in Relativity, 6 (1) 1, Bibcode:2003LRR.....6....1A, doi:10.12942/lrr-2003-1, PMC 5253894, PMID 28163638
- Ashtekar, Abhay (1986), "New variables for classical and quantum gravity", Phys. Rev. Lett., 57 (18): 2244–2247, Bibcode:1986PhRvL..57.2244A, doi:10.1103/PhysRevLett.57.2244, PMID 10033673
- Ashtekar, Abhay (1987), "New Hamiltonian formulation of general relativity", Phys. Rev. D, 36 (6): 1587–1602, Bibcode:1987PhRvD..36.1587A, doi:10.1103/PhysRevD.36.1587, PMID 9958340
- Ashtekar, Abhay (2007), "Loop Quantum Gravity: Four Recent Advances and a Dozen Frequently Asked Questions", Proceedings of the Eleventh Marcel Grossmann Meeting Meeting on General Relativity, The Eleventh Marcel Grossmann Meeting on Recent Developments in Theoretical and Experimental General Relativity, p. 126, arXiv:0705.2222, Bibcode:2008mgm..conf..126A, doi:10.1142/9789812834300_0008, ISBN 978-981-283-426-3, S2CID 119663169
- Ashtekar, Abhay; Krishnan, Badri (2004), "Isolated and Dynamical Horizons and Their Applications", Living Reviews in Relativity, 7 (1): 10, arXiv:gr-qc/0407042, Bibcode:2004LRR.....7...10A, doi:10.12942/lrr-2004-10, PMC 5253930, PMID 28163644
- Ashtekar, Abhay; Lewandowski, Jerzy (2004), "Background Independent Quantum Gravity: A Status Report", Class. Quantum Grav., 21 (15): R53–R152, arXiv:gr-qc/0404018, Bibcode:2004CQGra..21R..53A, doi:10.1088/0264-9381/21/15/R01, S2CID 119175535
- Ashtekar, Abhay; Magnon-Ashtekar, Anne (1979), "On conserved quantities in general relativity", Journal of Mathematical Physics, 20 (5): 793–800, Bibcode:1979JMP....20..793A, doi:10.1063/1.524151
- Auyang, Sunny Y. (1995), How is Quantum Field Theory Possible?, Oxford University Press, ISBN 978-0-19-509345-2
- Bania, T. M.; Rood, R. T.; Balser, D. S. (2002), "The cosmological density of baryons from observations of 3He+ in the Milky Way", Nature, 415 (6867): 54–57, Bibcode:2002Natur.415...54B, doi:10.1038/415054a, PMID 11780112, S2CID 4303625
- Barack, Leor; Cutler, Curt (2004), "LISA Capture Sources: Approximate Waveforms, Signal-to-Noise Ratios, and Parameter Estimation Accuracy", Phys. Rev. D, 69 (8) 082005, arXiv:gr-qc/0310125, Bibcode:2004PhRvD..69h2005B, doi:10.1103/PhysRevD.69.082005, S2CID 21565397
- Bardeen, J. M.; Carter, B.; Hawking, S. W. (1973), "The Four Laws of Black Hole Mechanics", Comm. Math. Phys., 31 (2): 161–170, Bibcode:1973CMaPh..31..161B, doi:10.1007/BF01645742, S2CID 54690354
- Barish, Barry (2005), "Towards detection of gravitational waves", in Florides, P.; Nolan, B.; Ottewil, A. (eds.), General Relativity and Gravitation. Proceedings of the 17th International Conference, World Scientific, pp. 24–34, Bibcode:2005grg..conf.....F, ISBN 978-981-256-424-5
- Barstow, M.; Bond, Howard E.; Holberg, J. B.; Burleigh, M. R.; Hubeny, I.; Koester, D. (2005), "Hubble Space Telescope Spectroscopy of the Balmer lines in Sirius B", Mon. Not. R. Astron. Soc., 362 (4): 1134–1142, arXiv:astro-ph/0506600, Bibcode:2005MNRAS.362.1134B, doi:10.1111/j.1365-2966.2005.09359.x, S2CID 4607496
- Bartusiak, Marcia (2000), Einstein's Unfinished Symphony: Listening to the Sounds of Space-Time, Berkley, ISBN 978-0-425-18620-6
- Begelman, Mitchell C.; Blandford, Roger D.; Rees, Martin J. (1984), "Theory of extragalactic radio sources", Rev. Mod. Phys., 56 (2): 255–351, Bibcode:1984RvMP...56..255B, doi:10.1103/RevModPhys.56.255
- Beig, Robert; Chruściel, Piotr T. (2006), "Stationary black holes", in Françoise, J.-P.; Naber, G.; Tsou, T.S. (eds.), Encyclopedia of Mathematical Physics, Volume 2, Elsevier, p. 2041, arXiv:gr-qc/0502041, Bibcode:2005gr.qc.....2041B, ISBN 978-0-12-512660-1
- Bekenstein, Jacob D. (1973), "Black Holes and Entropy", Phys. Rev. D, 7 (8): 2333–2346, Bibcode:1973PhRvD...7.2333B, doi:10.1103/PhysRevD.7.2333, S2CID 122636624
- Bekenstein, Jacob D. (1974), "Generalized Second Law of Thermodynamics in Black-Hole Physics", Phys. Rev. D, 9 (12): 3292–3300, Bibcode:1974PhRvD...9.3292B, doi:10.1103/PhysRevD.9.3292, S2CID 123043135
- Belinskii, V. A.; Khalatnikov, I. M.; Lifschitz, E. M. (1971), "Oscillatory approach to the singular point in relativistic cosmology", Advances in Physics, 19 (80): 525–573, Bibcode:1970AdPhy..19..525B, doi:10.1080/00018737000101171; original paper in Russian: Belinsky, V. A.; Lifshits, I. M.; Khalatnikov, E. M. (1970), "Колебательный Режим Приближения К Особой Точке В Релятивистской Космологии", Uspekhi Fizicheskikh Nauk, 102 (11): 463–500, Bibcode:1970UsFiN.102..463B, doi:10.3367/ufnr.0102.197011d.0463
- Bennett, C. L.; Halpern, M.; Hinshaw, G.; Jarosik, N.; Kogut, A.; Limon, M.; Meyer, S. S.; Page, L.; et al. (2003), "First Year Wilkinson Microwave Anisotropy Probe (WMAP) Observations: Preliminary Maps and Basic Results", Astrophys. J. Suppl. Ser., 148 (1): 1–27, arXiv:astro-ph/0302207, Bibcode:2003ApJS..148....1B, doi:10.1086/377253, S2CID 115601
- Berger, Beverly K. (2002), "Numerical Approaches to Spacetime Singularities", Living Reviews in Relativity, 5 (1) 1, arXiv:gr-qc/0201056, Bibcode:2002LRR.....5....1B, doi:10.12942/lrr-2002-1, PMC 5256073, PMID 28179859
- Bergström, Lars; Goobar, Ariel (2003), Cosmology and Particle Astrophysics (2nd ed.), Wiley & Sons, ISBN 978-3-540-43128-2
- Bertotti, Bruno; Ciufolini, Ignazio; Bender, Peter L. (1987), "New test of general relativity: Measurement of de Sitter geodetic precession rate for lunar perigee", Physical Review Letters, 58 (11): 1062–1065, Bibcode:1987PhRvL..58.1062B, doi:10.1103/PhysRevLett.58.1062, PMID 10034329
- Bertotti, Bruno; Iess, L.; Tortora, P. (2003), "A test of general relativity using radio links with the Cassini spacecraft", Nature, 425 (6956): 374–376, Bibcode:2003Natur.425..374B, doi:10.1038/nature01997, PMID 14508481, S2CID 4337125
- Bertschinger, Edmund (1998), "Simulations of structure formation in the universe", Annu. Rev. Astron. Astrophys., 36 (1): 599–654, Bibcode:1998ARA&A..36..599B, doi:10.1146/annurev.astro.36.1.599
- Birrell, N. D.; Davies, P. C. (1984), Quantum Fields in Curved Space, Cambridge University Press, ISBN 978-0-521-27858-4
- Blair, David; McNamara, Geoff (1997), Ripples on a Cosmic Sea. The Search for Gravitational Waves, Perseus, ISBN 978-0-7382-0137-5
- Blanchet, L.; Faye, G.; Iyer, B. R.; Sinha, S. (2008), "The third post-Newtonian gravitational wave polarisations and associated spherical harmonic modes for inspiralling compact binaries in quasi-circular orbits", Classical and Quantum Gravity, 25 (16) 165003, arXiv:0802.1249, Bibcode:2008CQGra..25p5003B, doi:10.1088/0264-9381/25/16/165003, S2CID 54608927
- Blanchet, Luc (2006), "Gravitational Radiation from Post-Newtonian Sources and Inspiralling Compact Binaries", Living Reviews in Relativity, 9 (1) 4, Bibcode:2006LRR.....9....4B, doi:10.12942/lrr-2006-4, PMC 5255899, PMID 28179874
- Blandford, R. D. (1987), "Astrophysical Black Holes", in Hawking, Stephen W.; Israel, Werner (eds.), 300 Years of Gravitation, Cambridge University Press, pp. 277–329, ISBN 978-0-521-37976-2
- Börner, Gerhard (1993), The Early Universe. Facts and Fiction, Springer, Bibcode:1993euff.book.....B, ISBN 978-0-387-56729-7
- Brandenberger, Robert H. (2008), "Conceptual problems of inflationary cosmology and a new approach to cosmological structure formation", in Lemoine, Martin; Martin, Jerome; Peter, Patrick (eds.), Inflationary Cosmology, Lecture Notes in Physics, vol. 738, pp. 393–424, arXiv:hep-th/0701111, Bibcode:2007LNP...738..393B, doi:10.1007/978-3-540-74353-8_11, ISBN 978-3-540-74352-1, S2CID 18752698
- Brans, C. H.; Dicke, R. H. (1961), "Mach's Principle and a Relativistic Theory of Gravitation", Physical Review, 124 (3): 925–935, Bibcode:1961PhRv..124..925B, doi:10.1103/PhysRev.124.925
- Bridle, Sarah L.; Lahav, Ofer; Ostriker, Jeremiah P.; Steinhardt, Paul J. (2003), "Precision Cosmology? Not Just Yet", Science, 299 (5612): 1532–1533, arXiv:astro-ph/0303180, Bibcode:2003Sci...299.1532B, doi:10.1126/science.1082158, PMID 12624255, S2CID 119368762
- Bruhat, Yvonne (1962), "The Cauchy Problem", in Witten, Louis (ed.), Gravitation: An Introduction to Current Research, Wiley, p. 130, ISBN 978-1-114-29166-9
- Buchert, Thomas (2008), "Dark Energy from Structure—A Status Report", General Relativity and Gravitation, 40 (2–3): 467–527, arXiv:0707.2153, Bibcode:2008GReGr..40..467B, doi:10.1007/s10714-007-0554-8, S2CID 17281664
- Buras, R.; Rampp, M.; Janka, H.-Th.; Kifonidis, K. (2003), "Improved Models of Stellar Core Collapse and Still no Explosions: What is Missing?", Phys. Rev. Lett., 90 (24) 241101, arXiv:astro-ph/0303171, Bibcode:2003PhRvL..90x1101B, doi:10.1103/PhysRevLett.90.241101, PMID 12857181, S2CID 27632148
- Caldwell, Robert R. (2004), "Dark Energy", Physics World, 17 (5): 37–42, doi:10.1088/2058-7058/17/5/36
- Carlip, Steven (2001), "Quantum Gravity: a Progress Report", Rep. Prog. Phys., 64 (8): 885–942, arXiv:gr-qc/0108040, Bibcode:2001RPPh...64..885C, doi:10.1088/0034-4885/64/8/301, S2CID 118923209
- Carroll, Bradley W.; Ostlie, Dale A. (1996), An Introduction to Modern Astrophysics, Addison-Wesley, Bibcode:1996ima..book.....C, ISBN 978-0-201-54730-6
- Carroll, Sean M. (2001), "The Cosmological Constant", Living Reviews in Relativity, 4 (1) 1, arXiv:astro-ph/0004075, Bibcode:2001LRR.....4....1C, doi:10.12942/lrr-2001-1, PMC 5256042, PMID 28179856
- Carter, Brandon (1979), "The general theory of the mechanical, electromagnetic and thermodynamic properties of black holes", in Hawking, S. W.; Israel, W. (eds.), General Relativity, an Einstein Centenary Survey, Cambridge University Press, pp. 294–369 and 860–863, ISBN 978-0-521-29928-2
- Celotti, Annalisa; Miller, John C.; Sciama, Dennis W. (1999), "Astrophysical evidence for the existence of black holes", Class. Quantum Grav., 16 (12A): A3–A21, arXiv:astro-ph/9912186, Bibcode:1999CQGra..16A...3C, doi:10.1088/0264-9381/16/12A/301, S2CID 17677758
- Chandrasekhar, Subrahmanyan (1983), The Mathematical Theory of Black Holes, New York: Oxford University Press, ISBN 978-0-19-850370-5
- Chandrasekhar, Subrahmanyan (1984), "The general theory of relativity – Why 'It is probably the most beautiful of all existing theories'", Journal of Astrophysics and Astronomy, 5 (1): 3–11, Bibcode:1984JApA....5....3C, doi:10.1007/BF02714967, S2CID 120910934
- Charbonnel, C.; Primas, F. (2005), "The Lithium Content of the Galactic Halo Stars", Astronomy & Astrophysics, 442 (3): 961–992, arXiv:astro-ph/0505247, Bibcode:2005A&A...442..961C, doi:10.1051/0004-6361:20042491, S2CID 119340132
- Ciufolini, Ignazio; Pavlis, Erricos C. (2004), "A confirmation of the general relativistic prediction of the Lense–Thirring effect", Nature, 431 (7011): 958–960, Bibcode:2004Natur.431..958C, doi:10.1038/nature03007, PMID 15496915, S2CID 4423434
- Ciufolini, Ignazio; Pavlis, Erricos C.; Peron, R. (2006), "Determination of frame-dragging using Earth gravity models from CHAMP and GRACE", New Astron., 11 (8): 527–550, Bibcode:2006NewA...11..527C, doi:10.1016/j.newast.2006.02.001
- Coc, A.; Vangioni-Flam, Elisabeth; Descouvemont, Pierre; Adahchour, Abderrahim; Angulo, Carmen (2004), "Updated Big Bang Nucleosynthesis confronted to WMAP observations and to the Abundance of Light Elements", Astrophysical Journal, 600 (2): 544–552, arXiv:astro-ph/0309480, Bibcode:2004ApJ...600..544C, doi:10.1086/380121, S2CID 16276658
- Cutler, Curt; Thorne, Kip S. (2002), "An overview of gravitational wave sources", in Bishop, Nigel; Maharaj, Sunil D. (eds.), Proceedings of 16th International Conference on General Relativity and Gravitation (GR16), World Scientific, p. 4090, arXiv:gr-qc/0204090, Bibcode:2002gr.qc.....4090C, ISBN 978-981-238-171-2
- Dalal, Neal; Holz, Daniel E.; Hughes, Scott A.; Jain, Bhuvnesh (2006), "Short GRB and binary black hole standard sirens as a probe of dark energy", Phys. Rev. D, 74 (6) 063006, arXiv:astro-ph/0601275, Bibcode:2006PhRvD..74f3006D, doi:10.1103/PhysRevD.74.063006, S2CID 10008243
- Danzmann, Karsten; Rüdiger, Albrecht (2003), "LISA Technology—Concepts, Status, Prospects" (PDF), Class. Quantum Grav., 20 (10): S1–S9, Bibcode:2003CQGra..20S...1D, doi:10.1088/0264-9381/20/10/301, hdl:11858/00-001M-0000-0013-5233-E, S2CID 250836327, archived from the original (PDF) on 26 September 2007
- Donoghue, John F. (1995), "Introduction to the Effective Field Theory Description of Gravity", in Cornet, Fernando (ed.), Effective Theories: Proceedings of the Advanced School, Almunecar, Spain, 26 June–1 July 1995, Singapore: World Scientific, p. 12024, arXiv:gr-qc/9512024, Bibcode:1995gr.qc....12024D, ISBN 978-981-02-2908-5
- Dediu, Adrian-Horia; Magdalena, Luis; Martín-Vide, Carlos, eds. (2015). Theory and Practice of Natural Computing: Fourth International Conference, TPNC 2015, Mieres, Spain, December 15–16, 2015. Proceedings. Springer. ISBN 978-3-319-26841-5.
- Duff, Michael (1996), "M-Theory (the Theory Formerly Known as Strings)", Int. J. Mod. Phys. A, 11 (32): 5623–5641, arXiv:hep-th/9608117, Bibcode:1996IJMPA..11.5623D, doi:10.1142/S0217751X96002583, S2CID 17432791
- Ehlers, Jürgen (1973), "Survey of general relativity theory", in Israel, Werner (ed.), Relativity, Astrophysics and Cosmology, D. Reidel, pp. 1–125, ISBN 978-90-277-0369-9
- Ehlers, Jürgen; Falco, Emilio E.; Schneider, Peter (1992), Gravitational lenses, Springer, ISBN 978-3-540-66506-9
- Ehlers, Jürgen; Lämmerzahl, Claus, eds. (2006), Special Relativity—Will it Survive the Next 101 Years?, Springer, ISBN 978-3-540-34522-0
- Ehlers, Jürgen; Rindler, Wolfgang (1997), "Local and Global Light Bending in Einstein's and other Gravitational Theories", General Relativity and Gravitation, 29 (4): 519–529, Bibcode:1997GReGr..29..519E, doi:10.1023/A:1018843001842, hdl:11858/00-001M-0000-0013-5AB5-4, S2CID 118162303
- Einstein, Albert (1907), "Über das Relativitätsprinzip und die aus demselben gezogene Folgerungen", Jahrbuch der Radioaktivität und Elektronik, 4: 411 See also English translation at Einstein Papers Project
- Einstein, Albert (1915), "Die Feldgleichungen der Gravitation", Sitzungsberichte der Preussischen Akademie der Wissenschaften zu Berlin: 844–847, Bibcode:1915SPAW.......844E See also English translation at Einstein Papers Project
- Einstein, Albert (1917), "Kosmologische Betrachtungen zur allgemeinen Relativitätstheorie", Sitzungsberichte der Preußischen Akademie der Wissenschaften: 142, Bibcode:1917SPAW.......142E See also English translation at Einstein Papers Project
- Ellis, George F R; Van Elst, Henk (1999), "Cosmological Models", in Lachièze-Rey, Marc (ed.), Theoretical and Observational Cosmology, vol. 541, pp. 1–116, arXiv:gr-qc/9812046, Bibcode:1999ASIC..541....1E, doi:10.1007/978-94-011-4455-1_1, ISBN 978-0-7923-5946-3, S2CID 122994560
- Engler, Gideon (2002), "Einstein and the most beautiful theories in physics", International Studies in the Philosophy of Science, 16 (1): 27–37, doi:10.1080/02698590120118800, S2CID 120160056
- Everitt, C. W. F.; Buchman, S.; DeBra, D. B.; Keiser, G. M. (2001), "Gravity Probe B: Countdown to launch", in Lämmerzahl, C.; Everitt, C. W. F.; Hehl, F. W. (eds.), Gyros, Clocks, and Interferometers: Testing Relativistic Gravity in Space (Lecture Notes in Physics 562), Springer, pp. 52–82, ISBN 978-3-540-41236-6
- Everitt, C. W. F.; Parkinson, Bradford; Kahn, Bob (2007), The Gravity Probe B experiment. Post Flight Analysis—Final Report (Preface and Executive Summary) (PDF), Project Report: NASA, Stanford University and Lockheed Martin, archived (PDF) from the original on 9 June 2007
- Falcke, Heino; Melia, Fulvio; Agol, Eric (2000), "Viewing the Shadow of the Black Hole at the Galactic Center", Astrophysical Journal, 528 (1): L13–L16, arXiv:astro-ph/9912263, Bibcode:2000ApJ...528L..13F, doi:10.1086/312423, PMID 10587484, S2CID 119433133
- Font, José A. (2003), "Numerical Hydrodynamics in General Relativity", Living Reviews in Relativity, 6 (1) 4, Bibcode:2003LRR.....6....4F, doi:10.12942/lrr-2003-4, PMC 5660627, PMID 29104452
- Fourès-Bruhat, Yvonne (1952), "Théoréme d'existence pour certains systémes d'équations aux derivées partielles non linéaires", Acta Mathematica, 88 (1): 141–225, Bibcode:1952AcMa...88..141F, doi:10.1007/BF02392131
- Frauendiener, Jörg (2004), "Conformal Infinity", Living Reviews in Relativity, 7 (1) 1, Bibcode:2004LRR.....7....1F, doi:10.12942/lrr-2004-1, PMC 5256109, PMID 28179863
- Friedrich, Helmut (2005), "Is general relativity 'essentially understood'?", Annalen der Physik, 15 (1–2): 84–108, arXiv:gr-qc/0508016, Bibcode:2006AnP...518...84F, doi:10.1002/andp.200510173, S2CID 37236624
- Futamase, T.; Itoh, Y. (2006), "The Post-Newtonian Approximation for Relativistic Compact Binaries", Living Reviews in Relativity, 10 (1): 2, Bibcode:2007LRR....10....2F, doi:10.12942/lrr-2007-2, PMC 5255906, PMID 28179819
- Gamow, George (1970), My World Line, Viking Press, ISBN 978-0-670-50376-6
- Garfinkle, David (2007), "Of singularities and breadmaking", Einstein Online, Max Planck Institute for Gravitational Physics, archived from the original on 10 August 2007
- Geroch, Robert (1996). "Partial Differential Equations of Physics". General Relativity: 19. arXiv:gr-qc/9602055. Bibcode:1996gere.conf...19G.
- Giulini, Domenico (2005), Special Relativity: A First Encounter, Oxford University Press, ISBN 978-0-19-856746-2
- Giulini, Domenico (2006), "Algebraic and Geometric Structures in Special Relativity", in Ehlers, Jürgen; Lämmerzahl, Claus (eds.), Special Relativity—Will it Survive the Next 101 Years?, Lecture Notes in Physics, vol. 702, pp. 45–111, arXiv:math-ph/0602018, Bibcode:2006math.ph...2018G, doi:10.1007/3-540-34523-X_4, ISBN 978-3-540-34522-0, S2CID 15948765
- Giulini, Domenico (2007), "Remarks on the Notions of General Covariance and Background Independence", in Stamatescu, I. O. (ed.), Approaches to Fundamental Physics, Lecture Notes in Physics, vol. 721, pp. 105–120, arXiv:gr-qc/0603087, Bibcode:2007LNP...721..105G, doi:10.1007/978-3-540-71117-9_6, ISBN 978-3-540-71115-5, S2CID 14772226
- Gnedin, Nickolay Y. (2005), "Digitizing the Universe", Nature, 435 (7042): 572–573, Bibcode:2005Natur.435..572G, doi:10.1038/435572a, PMID 15931201, S2CID 3023436
- Goenner, Hubert F. M. (2004), "On the History of Unified Field Theories", Living Reviews in Relativity, 7 (1) 2, Bibcode:2004LRR.....7....2G, doi:10.12942/lrr-2004-2, PMC 5256024, PMID 28179864
- Goroff, Marc H.; Sagnotti, Augusto (1985), "Quantum gravity at two loops", Phys. Lett., 160B (1–3): 81–86, Bibcode:1985PhLB..160...81G, doi:10.1016/0370-2693(85)91470-4
- Gourgoulhon, Eric (2007). "3+1 Formalism and Bases of Numerical Relativity". arXiv:gr-qc/0703035.
- Gowdy, Robert H. (1971), "Gravitational Waves in Closed Universes", Phys. Rev. Lett., 27 (12): 826–829, Bibcode:1971PhRvL..27..826G, doi:10.1103/PhysRevLett.27.826
- Gowdy, Robert H. (1974), "Vacuum spacetimes with two-parameter spacelike isometry groups and compact invariant hypersurfaces: Topologies and boundary conditions", Annals of Physics, 83 (1): 203–241, Bibcode:1974AnPhy..83..203G, doi:10.1016/0003-4916(74)90384-4
- Green, M. B.; Schwarz, J. H.; Witten, E. (1987), Superstring theory. Volume 1: Introduction, Cambridge University Press, ISBN 978-0-521-35752-4
- Greenstein, J. L.; Oke, J. B.; Shipman, H. L. (1971), "Effective Temperature, Radius, and Gravitational Redshift of Sirius B", Astrophysical Journal, 169: 563, Bibcode:1971ApJ...169..563G, doi:10.1086/151174
- Hamber, Herbert W. (2009), Hamber, Herbert W (ed.), Quantum Gravitation – The Feynman Path Integral Approach, Springer Publishing, doi:10.1007/978-3-540-85293-3, hdl:11858/00-001M-0000-0013-471D-A, ISBN 978-3-540-85292-6
- Gödel, Kurt (1949). "An Example of a New Type of Cosmological Solution of Einstein's Field Equations of Gravitation". Rev. Mod. Phys. 21 (3): 447–450. Bibcode:1949RvMP...21..447G. doi:10.1103/RevModPhys.21.447.
- Hafele, J. C.; Keating, R. E. (14 July 1972). "Around-the-World Atomic Clocks: Predicted Relativistic Time Gains". Science. 177 (4044): 166–168. Bibcode:1972Sci...177..166H. doi:10.1126/science.177.4044.166. PMID 17779917. S2CID 10067969.
- Hafele, J. C.; Keating, R. E. (14 July 1972). "Around-the-World Atomic Clocks: Observed Relativistic Time Gains". Science. 177 (4044): 168–170. Bibcode:1972Sci...177..168H. doi:10.1126/science.177.4044.168. PMID 17779918. S2CID 37376002.
- Havas, P. (1964), "Four-Dimensional Formulation of Newtonian Mechanics and Their Relation to the Special and the General Theory of Relativity", Rev. Mod. Phys., 36 (4): 938–965, Bibcode:1964RvMP...36..938H, doi:10.1103/RevModPhys.36.938
- Hawking, Stephen W. (1966), "The occurrence of singularities in cosmology", Proceedings of the Royal Society of London. Series A. Mathematical and Physical Sciences, 294 (1439): 511–521, Bibcode:1966RSPSA.294..511H, doi:10.1098/rspa.1966.0221, JSTOR 2415489, S2CID 120730123
- Hawking, S. W. (1975), "Particle Creation by Black Holes", Communications in Mathematical Physics, 43 (3): 199–220, Bibcode:1975CMaPh..43..199H, doi:10.1007/BF02345020, S2CID 55539246
- Hawking, Stephen W. (1987), "Quantum cosmology", in Hawking, Stephen W.; Israel, Werner (eds.), 300 Years of Gravitation, Cambridge University Press, pp. 631–651, ISBN 978-0-521-37976-2
- Hawking, Stephen W.; Ellis, George F. R. (1973), The large scale structure of space-time, Cambridge University Press, ISBN 978-0-521-09906-6
- Heckmann, O. H. L.; Schücking, E. (1959), "Newtonsche und Einsteinsche Kosmologie", in Flügge, S. (ed.), Encyclopedia of Physics, vol. 53, p. 489
- Heusler, Markus (1998), "Stationary Black Holes: Uniqueness and Beyond", Living Reviews in Relativity, 1 (1) 6, Bibcode:1998LRR.....1....6H, doi:10.12942/lrr-1998-6, PMC 5567259, PMID 28937184
- Heusler, Markus (1996), Black Hole Uniqueness Theorems, Cambridge Lecture Notes in Physics, vol. 6, Cambridge University Press, Bibcode:1996CLNP....6.....H, ISBN 978-0-521-56735-0
- Hey, Tony; Walters, Patrick (2003), The new quantum universe, Cambridge University Press, Bibcode:2003nqu..book.....H, ISBN 978-0-521-56457-1
- Hough, Jim; Rowan, Sheila (2000), "Gravitational Wave Detection by Interferometry (Ground and Space)", Living Reviews in Relativity, 3 (1): 3, Bibcode:2000LRR.....3....3R, doi:10.12942/lrr-2000-3, PMC 5255574, PMID 28179855
- Hubble, Edwin (1929), "A Relation between Distance and Radial Velocity among Extra-Galactic Nebulae", Proc. Natl. Acad. Sci., 15 (3): 168–173, Bibcode:1929PNAS...15..168H, doi:10.1073/pnas.15.3.168, PMC 522427, PMID 16577160
- Hulse, Russell A.; Taylor, Joseph H. (1975), "Discovery of a pulsar in a binary system", Astrophys. J., 195: L51–L55, Bibcode:1975ApJ...195L..51H, doi:10.1086/181708
- Ibanez, L. E. (2000), "The second string (phenomenology) revolution", Class. Quantum Grav., 17 (5): 1117–1128, arXiv:hep-ph/9911499, Bibcode:2000CQGra..17.1117I, doi:10.1088/0264-9381/17/5/321, S2CID 15707877
- Iorio, L. (2006), "A note on the evidence of the gravitomagnetic field of Mars", Classical and Quantum Gravity, 23 (17): 5451–5454, arXiv:gr-qc/0606092, Bibcode:2006CQGra..23.5451I, doi:10.1088/0264-9381/23/17/N01, S2CID 118233440
- Iorio, L. (2009), "An Assessment of the Systematic Uncertainty in Present and Future Tests of the Lense–Thirring Effect with Satellite Laser Ranging", Space Sci. Rev., 148 (1–4): 363–381, arXiv:0809.1373, Bibcode:2009SSRv..148..363I, doi:10.1007/s11214-008-9478-1, S2CID 15698399
- Iorio, L. (2010), "On the Lense–Thirring test with the Mars Global Surveyor in the gravitational field of Mars", Central European Journal of Physics, 8 (3): 509–513, arXiv:gr-qc/0701146, Bibcode:2010CEJPh...8..509I, doi:10.2478/s11534-009-0117-6, S2CID 16052420
- Isham, Christopher J. (1994), "Prima facie questions in quantum gravity", in Ehlers, Jürgen; Friedrich, Helmut (eds.), Canonical Gravity: From Classical to Quantum, Lecture Notes in Physics, vol. 434, Springer, Bibcode:1994LNP...434.....E, doi:10.1007/3540583394, ISBN 978-3-540-58339-4
- Israel, Werner (1971), "Event Horizons and Gravitational Collapse", General Relativity and Gravitation, 2 (1): 53–59, Bibcode:1971GReGr...2...53I, doi:10.1007/BF02450518, S2CID 119645546
- Israel, Werner (1987), "Dark stars: the evolution of an idea", in Hawking, Stephen W.; Israel, Werner (eds.), 300 Years of Gravitation, Cambridge University Press, pp. 199–276, ISBN 978-0-521-37976-2
- Janssen, Michel (2005), "Of pots and holes: Einstein's bumpy road to general relativity", Annalen der Physik, 14 (S1): 58–85, Bibcode:2005AnP...517S..58J, doi:10.1002/andp.200410130, S2CID 10641693, archived from the original (PDF) on 25 August 2020
- Jaranowski, Piotr; Królak, Andrzej (2005), "Gravitational-Wave Data Analysis. Formalism and Sample Applications: The Gaussian Case", Living Reviews in Relativity, 8 (1): 3, Bibcode:2005LRR.....8....3J, doi:10.12942/lrr-2005-3, PMC 5253919, PMID 28163647
- Kahn, Bob (1996–2012), Gravity Probe B Website, Stanford University
- Kahn, Bob (14 April 2007), Was Einstein right? Scientists provide first public peek at Gravity Probe B results (Stanford University Press Release) (PDF), Stanford University News Service, archived (PDF) from the original on 23 April 2007
- Kamionkowski, Marc; Kosowsky, Arthur; Stebbins, Albert (1997), "Statistics of Cosmic Microwave Background Polarization", Phys. Rev. D, 55 (12): 7368–7388, arXiv:astro-ph/9611125, Bibcode:1997PhRvD..55.7368K, doi:10.1103/PhysRevD.55.7368, S2CID 14018215
- Kennefick, Daniel (2005), "Astronomers Test General Relativity: Light-bending and the Solar Redshift", in Renn, Jürgen (ed.), One hundred authors for Einstein, Wiley-VCH, pp. 178–181, ISBN 978-3-527-40574-9
- Kennefick, Daniel (2007), "Not Only Because of Theory: Dyson, Eddington and the Competing Myths of the 1919 Eclipse Expedition", Proceedings of the 7th Conference on the History of General Relativity, Tenerife, 2005, vol. 0709, p. 685, arXiv:0709.0685, Bibcode:2007arXiv0709.0685K, doi:10.1016/j.shpsa.2012.07.010, S2CID 119203172
- Kenyon, I. R. (1990), General Relativity, Oxford University Press, ISBN 978-0-19-851996-6
- Kochanek, C.S.; Falco, E.E.; Impey, C.; Lehar, J. (2007), CASTLES Survey Website, Harvard-Smithsonian Center for Astrophysics
- Komar, Arthur (1959), "Covariant Conservation Laws in General Relativity", Phys. Rev., 113 (3): 934–936, Bibcode:1959PhRv..113..934K, doi:10.1103/PhysRev.113.934
- Kramer, Michael (2004). "Millisecond Pulsarsas Tools of Fundamental Physics". In Karshenboim, S. G.; Peik, E. (eds.). Astrophysics, Clocks and Fundamental Constants. Lecture Notes in Physics. Vol. 648. pp. 33–54. arXiv:astro-ph/0405178. Bibcode:2004LNP...648...33K. doi:10.1007/978-3-540-40991-5_3. ISBN 978-3-540-21967-5.
- Kramer, M.; Stairs, I. H.; Manchester, R. N.; McLaughlin, M. A.; Lyne, A. G.; Ferdman, R. D.; Burgay, M.; Lorimer, D. R.; et al. (2006), "Tests of general relativity from timing the double pulsar", Science, 314 (5796): 97–102, arXiv:astro-ph/0609417, Bibcode:2006Sci...314...97K, doi:10.1126/science.1132305, PMID 16973838, S2CID 6674714
- Kraus, Ute (1998), "Light Deflection Near Neutron Stars", Relativistic Astrophysics, Vieweg, pp. 66–81, ISBN 978-3-528-06909-4
- Kuchař, Karel (1973), "Canonical Quantization of Gravity", in Israel, Werner (ed.), Relativity, Astrophysics and Cosmology, D. Reidel, pp. 237–288, ISBN 978-90-277-0369-9
- Künzle, H. P. (1972), "Galilei and Lorentz Structures on spacetime: comparison of the corresponding geometry and physics", Annales de l'Institut Henri Poincaré A, 17: 337–362
- Lahav, Ofer; Suto, Yasushi (2004), "Measuring our Universe from Galaxy Redshift Surveys", Living Reviews in Relativity, 7 (1): 8, arXiv:astro-ph/0310642, Bibcode:2004LRR.....7....8L, doi:10.12942/lrr-2004-8, PMC 5253994, PMID 28163643
- Landau, L. D.; Lifshitz, E. M. (1975), The Classical Theory of Fields, v. 2, Elsevier Science, Ltd., ISBN 978-0-08-018176-9
- Lehner, Luis (2001), "Numerical Relativity: A review", Class. Quantum Grav., 18 (17): R25–R86, arXiv:gr-qc/0106072, Bibcode:2001CQGra..18R..25L, doi:10.1088/0264-9381/18/17/202, S2CID 9715975
- Lehner, Luis (2002). "Numerical Relativity: Status and Prospects". In Nigel T. Bishop; Sunil D. Maharaj (eds.). General Relativity and Gravitation. General Relativity and Gravitation: Proceedings of the 16th International Conference, Durban, South Africa, 15–21 July 2001. p. 210. arXiv:gr-qc/0202055. Bibcode:2002grg..conf..210L. doi:10.1142/9789812776556_0010. ISBN 978-981-238-171-2. S2CID 9145148.
- Linde, Andrei (2005), Particle Physics and Inflationary Cosmology, Contemporary Concepts in Physics, vol. 5, pp. 1–362, arXiv:hep-th/0503203, Bibcode:2005hep.th....3203L, ISBN 978-3-7186-0489-0
- Linde, Andrei (2006), "Towards inflation in string theory", J. Phys. Conf. Ser., 24 (1): 151–160, arXiv:hep-th/0503195, Bibcode:2005JPhCS..24..151L, doi:10.1088/1742-6596/24/1/018, S2CID 250677699
- Loll, Renate (1998), "Discrete Approaches to Quantum Gravity in Four Dimensions", Living Reviews in Relativity, 1 (1) 13, arXiv:gr-qc/9805049, Bibcode:1998LRR.....1...13L, doi:10.12942/lrr-1998-13, PMC 5253799, PMID 28191826
- Lovelock, David (1972), "The Four-Dimensionality of Space and the Einstein Tensor", J. Math. Phys., 13 (6): 874–876, Bibcode:1972JMP....13..874L, doi:10.1063/1.1666069
- MacCallum, M. (2006), "Finding and using exact solutions of the Einstein equations", in Mornas, L.; Alonso, J. D. (eds.), AIP Conference Proceedings (A Century of Relativity Physics: ERE05, the XXVIII Spanish Relativity Meeting), vol. 841, pp. 129–143, arXiv:gr-qc/0601102, Bibcode:2006AIPC..841..129M, doi:10.1063/1.2218172, S2CID 13096531
- Maddox, John (1998), What Remains To Be Discovered, Macmillan, ISBN 978-0-684-82292-1
- Mannheim, Philip D. (2006), "Alternatives to Dark Matter and Dark Energy", Prog. Part. Nucl. Phys., 56 (2): 340–445, arXiv:astro-ph/0505266, Bibcode:2006PrPNP..56..340M, doi:10.1016/j.ppnp.2005.08.001, S2CID 14024934
- Mather, J. C.; Cheng, E. S.; Cottingham, D. A.; Eplee, R. E.; Fixsen, D. J.; Hewagama, T.; Isaacman, R. B.; Jensen, K. A.; et al. (1994), "Measurement of the cosmic microwave spectrum by the COBE FIRAS instrument", Astrophysical Journal, 420: 439–444, Bibcode:1994ApJ...420..439M, doi:10.1086/173574
- Mermin, N. David (2005), It's About Time. Understanding Einstein's Relativity, Princeton University Press, Bibcode:2005iatu.book.....M, ISBN 978-0-691-12201-4
- Messiah, Albert (1999), Quantum Mechanics, Dover Publications, ISBN 978-0-486-40924-5
- Miller, Cole (2002), Stellar Structure and Evolution (Lecture notes for Astronomy 606), University of Maryland
- Misner, Charles W.; Thorne, Kip. S.; Wheeler, John A. (1973), Gravitation, W. H. Freeman, ISBN 978-0-7167-0344-0
- Narayan, Ramesh (2006), "Black holes in astrophysics", New Journal of Physics, 7 (1): 199, arXiv:gr-qc/0506078, Bibcode:2005NJPh....7..199N, doi:10.1088/1367-2630/7/1/199, S2CID 17986323
- Narayan, Ramesh; Bartelmann, Matthias (1997). "Lectures on Gravitational Lensing". arXiv:astro-ph/9606001.
- Narlikar, Jayant V. (1993), Introduction to Cosmology, Cambridge University Press, ISBN 978-0-521-41250-6
- Nordström, Gunnar (1918), "On the Energy of the Gravitational Field in Einstein's Theory", Verhandl. Koninkl. Ned. Akad. Wetenschap., 26: 1238–1245, Bibcode:1918KNAB...20.1238N
- Nordtvedt, Kenneth (2003). "Lunar Laser Ranging—a comprehensive probe of post-Newtonian gravity". arXiv:gr-qc/0301024.
- Norton, John D. (1985), "What was Einstein's principle of equivalence?" (PDF), Studies in History and Philosophy of Science, 16 (3): 203–246, Bibcode:1985SHPSA..16..203N, doi:10.1016/0039-3681(85)90002-0, archived (PDF) from the original on 22 September 2006
- Ohanian, Hans C.; Ruffini, Remo (1994), Gravitation and Spacetime, W. W. Norton & Company, ISBN 978-0-393-96501-8
- Olive, K. A.; Skillman, E. A. (2004), "A Realistic Determination of the Error on the Primordial Helium Abundance", Astrophysical Journal, 617 (1): 29–49, arXiv:astro-ph/0405588, Bibcode:2004ApJ...617...29O, doi:10.1086/425170, S2CID 15187664
- O'Meara, John M.; Tytler, David; Kirkman, David; Suzuki, Nao; Prochaska, Jason X.; Lubin, Dan; Wolfe, Arthur M. (2001), "The Deuterium to Hydrogen Abundance Ratio Towards a Fourth QSO: HS0105+1619", Astrophysical Journal, 552 (2): 718–730, arXiv:astro-ph/0011179, Bibcode:2001ApJ...552..718O, doi:10.1086/320579, S2CID 14164537
- Oppenheimer, J. Robert; Snyder, H. (1939), "On continued gravitational contraction", Physical Review, 56 (5): 455–459, Bibcode:1939PhRv...56..455O, doi:10.1103/PhysRev.56.455
- Overbye, Dennis (1999), Lonely Hearts of the Cosmos: the story of the scientific quest for the secret of the Universe, Back Bay, ISBN 978-0-316-64896-7
- Pais, Abraham (1982), 'Subtle is the Lord ...' The Science and life of Albert Einstein, Oxford University Press, ISBN 978-0-19-853907-0
- Peacock, John A. (1999), Cosmological Physics, Cambridge University Press, ISBN 978-0-521-41072-4
- Peebles, P. J. E. (1966), "Primordial Helium abundance and primordial fireball II", Astrophysical Journal, 146: 542–552, Bibcode:1966ApJ...146..542P, doi:10.1086/148918
- Peebles, P. J. E. (1993), Principles of physical cosmology, Princeton University Press, ISBN 978-0-691-01933-8
- Peebles, P.J.E.; Schramm, D.N.; Turner, E.L.; Kron, R.G. (1991), "The case for the relativistic hot Big Bang cosmology", Nature, 352 (6338): 769–776, Bibcode:1991Natur.352..769P, doi:10.1038/352769a0, S2CID 4337502
- Penrose, Roger (1965), "Gravitational collapse and spacetime singularities", Physical Review Letters, 14 (3): 57–59, Bibcode:1965PhRvL..14...57P, doi:10.1103/PhysRevLett.14.57
- Penrose, Roger (1969), "Gravitational collapse: the role of general relativity", Rivista del Nuovo Cimento, 1: 252–276, Bibcode:1969NCimR...1..252P
- Penrose, Roger (2004), The Road to Reality, A. A. Knopf, ISBN 978-0-679-45443-4
- Penzias, A. A.; Wilson, R. W. (1965), "A measurement of excess antenna temperature at 4080 Mc/s", Astrophysical Journal, 142: 419–421, Bibcode:1965ApJ...142..419P, doi:10.1086/148307
- Peskin, Michael E.; Schroeder, Daniel V. (1995), An Introduction to Quantum Field Theory, Addison-Wesley, ISBN 978-0-201-50397-5
- Peskin, Michael E. (2007), "Dark Matter and Particle Physics", Journal of the Physical Society of Japan, 76 (11) 111017, arXiv:0707.1536, Bibcode:2007JPSJ...76k1017P, doi:10.1143/JPSJ.76.111017, S2CID 16276112
- Poincaré, M. H. (1905), "Sur la dynamique de l'électron", Comptes rendus hebdomadaires des séances de l'Académie des sciences, 140: 1504–1508
- Poisson, Eric (27 May 2004a). "The Motion of Point Particles in Curved Spacetime". Living Reviews in Relativity. 7 (1) 6. arXiv:gr-qc/0306052. Bibcode:2004LRR.....7....6P. doi:10.12942/lrr-2004-6. PMC 5256043. PMID 28179866.
- Poisson, Eric (2004), A Relativist's Toolkit. The Mathematics of Black-Hole Mechanics, Cambridge University Press, Bibcode:2004rtmb.book.....P, ISBN 978-0-521-83091-1
- Polchinski, Joseph (1998a), String Theory Vol. I: An Introduction to the Bosonic String, Cambridge University Press, ISBN 978-0-521-63303-1
- Polchinski, Joseph (1998b), String Theory Vol. II: Superstring Theory and Beyond, Cambridge University Press, ISBN 978-0-521-63304-8
- Pound, R. V.; Rebka, G. A. (1959), "Gravitational Red-Shift in Nuclear Resonance", Physical Review Letters, 3 (9): 439–441, Bibcode:1959PhRvL...3..439P, doi:10.1103/PhysRevLett.3.439
- Pound, R. V.; Rebka, G. A. (1960), "Apparent weight of photons", Phys. Rev. Lett., 4 (7): 337–341, Bibcode:1960PhRvL...4..337P, doi:10.1103/PhysRevLett.4.337
- Pound, R. V.; Snider, J. L. (1964), "Effect of Gravity on Nuclear Resonance", Phys. Rev. Lett., 13 (18): 539–540, Bibcode:1964PhRvL..13..539P, doi:10.1103/PhysRevLett.13.539
- Ramond, Pierre (1990), Field Theory: A Modern Primer, Addison-Wesley, ISBN 978-0-201-54611-8
- Rees, Martin (1966), "Appearance of Relativistically Expanding Radio Sources", Nature, 211 (5048): 468–470, Bibcode:1966Natur.211..468R, doi:10.1038/211468a0, S2CID 41065207
- Reissner, H. (1916), "Über die Eigengravitation des elektrischen Feldes nach der Einsteinschen Theorie", Annalen der Physik, 355 (9): 106–120, Bibcode:1916AnP...355..106R, doi:10.1002/andp.19163550905
- Remillard, Ronald A.; Lin, Dacheng; Cooper, Randall L.; Narayan, Ramesh (2006), "The Rates of Type I X-Ray Bursts from Transients Observed with RXTE: Evidence for Black Hole Event Horizons", Astrophysical Journal, 646 (1): 407–419, arXiv:astro-ph/0509758, Bibcode:2006ApJ...646..407R, doi:10.1086/504862, S2CID 14949527
- Renn, Jürgen, ed. (2007), The Genesis of General Relativity (4 Volumes), Dordrecht: Springer, ISBN 978-1-4020-3999-7
- Renn, Jürgen, ed. (2005), Albert Einstein—Chief Engineer of the Universe: Einstein's Life and Work in Context, Berlin: Wiley-VCH, ISBN 978-3-527-40571-8
- Reula, Oscar A. (1998), "Hyperbolic Methods for Einstein's Equations", Living Reviews in Relativity, 1 (1) 3, Bibcode:1998LRR.....1....3R, doi:10.12942/lrr-1998-3, PMC 5253804, PMID 28191833
- Rindler, Wolfgang (2001), Relativity. Special, General and Cosmological, Oxford University Press, Bibcode:2001rsgc.book.....R, ISBN 978-0-19-850836-6
- Rindler, Wolfgang (1991), Introduction to Special Relativity, Clarendon Press, Oxford, ISBN 978-0-19-853952-0
- Robson, Ian (1996), Active galactic nuclei, John Wiley, ISBN 978-0-471-95853-6
- Roulet, E.; Mollerach, S. (1997), "Microlensing", Physics Reports, 279 (2): 67–118, arXiv:astro-ph/9603119, Bibcode:1997PhR...279...67R, doi:10.1016/S0370-1573(96)00020-8, S2CID 262685723
- Rovelli, Carlo, ed. (2015), General Relativity: The most beautiful of theories (de Gruyter Studies in Mathematical Physics), Boston: Walter de Gruyter GmbH, ISBN 978-3-11-034042-6
- Rovelli, Carlo (2000). "Notes for a brief history of quantum gravity". arXiv:gr-qc/0006061.
- Rovelli, Carlo (1998), "Loop Quantum Gravity", Living Reviews in Relativity, 1 (1) 1, arXiv:gr-qc/9710008, Bibcode:1998LRR.....1....1R, doi:10.12942/lrr-1998-1, PMC 5567241, PMID 28937180
- Schäfer, Gerhard (2004), "Gravitomagnetic Effects", General Relativity and Gravitation, 36 (10): 2223–2235, arXiv:gr-qc/0407116, Bibcode:2004GReGr..36.2223S, doi:10.1023/B:GERG.0000046180.97877.32, S2CID 14255129
- Schödel, R.; Ott, T.; Genzel, R.; Eckart, A.; Mouawad, N.; Alexander, T. (2003), "Stellar Dynamics in the Central Arcsecond of Our Galaxy", Astrophysical Journal, 596 (2): 1015–1034, arXiv:astro-ph/0306214, Bibcode:2003ApJ...596.1015S, doi:10.1086/378122, S2CID 17719367
- Schutz, Bernard F. (1985), A first course in general relativity, Cambridge University Press, ISBN 978-0-521-27703-7
- Schutz, Bernard F. (2003), Gravity from the ground up, Cambridge University Press, Bibcode:2003ggu..book.....S, ISBN 978-0-521-45506-0
- Schwarz, John H. (2007), "String Theory: Progress and Problems", Progress of Theoretical Physics Supplement, 170: 214–226, arXiv:hep-th/0702219, Bibcode:2007PThPS.170..214S, doi:10.1143/PTPS.170.214, S2CID 16762545
- Schwarzschild, Karl (1916a), "Über das Gravitationsfeld eines Massenpunktes nach der Einsteinschen Theorie", Sitzungsber. Preuss. Akad. D. Wiss.: 189–196, Bibcode:1916SPAW.......189S
- Schwarzschild, Karl (1916b), "Über das Gravitationsfeld einer Kugel aus inkompressibler Flüssigkeit nach der Einsteinschen Theorie", Sitzungsber. Preuss. Akad. D. Wiss.: 424–434, Bibcode:1916skpa.conf..424S
- Seidel, Edward (1998), "Numerical Relativity: Towards Simulations of 3D Black Hole Coalescence", in Narlikar, J. V.; Dadhich, N. (eds.), Gravitation and Relativity: At the turn of the millennium (Proceedings of the GR-15 Conference, held at IUCAA, Pune, India, December 16–21, 1997), IUCAA, p. 6088, arXiv:gr-qc/9806088, Bibcode:1998gr.qc.....6088S, ISBN 978-81-900378-3-9
- Seljak, Uros̆; Zaldarriaga, Matias (1997), "Signature of Gravity Waves in the Polarization of the Microwave Background", Phys. Rev. Lett., 78 (11): 2054–2057, arXiv:astro-ph/9609169, Bibcode:1997PhRvL..78.2054S, doi:10.1103/PhysRevLett.78.2054, S2CID 30795875
- Shapiro, S. S.; Davis, J. L.; Lebach, D. E.; Gregory, J. S. (2004), "Measurement of the solar gravitational deflection of radio waves using geodetic very-long-baseline interferometry data, 1979–1999", Phys. Rev. Lett., 92 (12) 121101, Bibcode:2004PhRvL..92l1101S, doi:10.1103/PhysRevLett.92.121101, PMID 15089661
- Shapiro, Irwin I. (1964), "Fourth test of general relativity", Phys. Rev. Lett., 13 (26): 789–791, Bibcode:1964PhRvL..13..789S, doi:10.1103/PhysRevLett.13.789
- Singh, Simon (2004), Big Bang: The Origin of the Universe, Fourth Estate, Bibcode:2004biba.book.....S, ISBN 978-0-00-715251-3
- Sorkin, Rafael D. (2005), "Causal Sets: Discrete Gravity", in Gomberoff, Andres; Marolf, Donald (eds.), Lectures on Quantum Gravity, Springer, p. 9009, arXiv:gr-qc/0309009, Bibcode:2003gr.qc.....9009S, ISBN 978-0-387-23995-8
- Sorkin, Rafael D. (1997), "Forks in the Road, on the Way to Quantum Gravity", Int. J. Theor. Phys., 36 (12): 2759–2781, arXiv:gr-qc/9706002, Bibcode:1997IJTP...36.2759S, doi:10.1007/BF02435709, S2CID 4803804
- Spergel, D. N.; Verde, L.; Peiris, H. V.; Komatsu, E.; Nolta, M. R.; Bennett, C. L.; Halpern, M.; Hinshaw, G.; et al. (2003), "First Year Wilkinson Microwave Anisotropy Probe (WMAP) Observations: Determination of Cosmological Parameters", Astrophys. J. Suppl. Ser., 148 (1): 175–194, arXiv:astro-ph/0302209, Bibcode:2003ApJS..148..175S, doi:10.1086/377226, S2CID 10794058
- Spergel, D. N.; Bean, R.; Doré, O.; Nolta, M. R.; Bennett, C. L.; Dunkley, J.; Hinshaw, G.; Jarosik, N.; et al. (2007), "Wilkinson Microwave Anisotropy Probe (WMAP) Three Year Results: Implications for Cosmology", Astrophysical Journal Supplement, 170 (2): 377–408, arXiv:astro-ph/0603449, Bibcode:2007ApJS..170..377S, doi:10.1086/513700, S2CID 1386346
- Springel, Volker; White, Simon D. M.; Jenkins, Adrian; Frenk, Carlos S.; Yoshida, Naoki; Gao, Liang; Navarro, Julio; Thacker, Robert; et al. (2005), "Simulations of the formation, evolution and clustering of galaxies and quasars", Nature, 435 (7042): 629–636, arXiv:astro-ph/0504097, Bibcode:2005Natur.435..629S, doi:10.1038/nature03597, PMID 15931216, S2CID 4383030
- Stairs, Ingrid H. (2003), "Testing General Relativity with Pulsar Timing", Living Reviews in Relativity, 6 (1) 5, arXiv:astro-ph/0307536, Bibcode:2003LRR.....6....5S, doi:10.12942/lrr-2003-5, PMC 5253800, PMID 28163640
- Stephani, H.; Kramer, D.; MacCallum, M.; Hoenselaers, C.; Herlt, E. (2003), Exact Solutions of Einstein's Field Equations (2 ed.), Cambridge University Press, ISBN 978-0-521-46136-8
- Synge, J. L. (1972), Relativity: The Special Theory, North-Holland Publishing Company, ISBN 978-0-7204-0064-9
- Szabados, László B. (2004), "Quasi-Local Energy–Momentum and Angular Momentum in GR", Living Reviews in Relativity, 7 (1): 4, Bibcode:2004LRR.....7....4S, doi:10.12942/lrr-2004-4, PMC 5255888, PMID 28179865
- Taylor, Joseph H. (1994), "Binary pulsars and relativistic gravity", Rev. Mod. Phys., 66 (3): 711–719, Bibcode:1994RvMP...66..711T, doi:10.1103/RevModPhys.66.711, S2CID 120534048
- Thiemann, Thomas (2007), "Loop Quantum Gravity: An Inside View", Approaches to Fundamental Physics, Lecture Notes in Physics, vol. 721, pp. 185–263, arXiv:hep-th/0608210, Bibcode:2007LNP...721..185T, doi:10.1007/978-3-540-71117-9_10, ISBN 978-3-540-71115-5, S2CID 119572847
- Thiemann, Thomas (2003). "Lectures on Loop Quantum Gravity". In Domenico J.W. Giulini; Claus Kiefer; Claus Lämmerzahl (eds.). Quantum Gravity: From Theory to Experimental Search. Lecture Notes in Physics. Vol. 631. pp. 41–135. arXiv:gr-qc/0210094. Bibcode:2003LNP...631...41T. doi:10.1007/978-3-540-45230-0_3. ISBN 978-3-540-40810-9. S2CID 119151491.
- 't Hooft, Gerard; Veltman, Martinus (1974), "One Loop Divergencies in the Theory of Gravitation", Annales de l'Institut Henri Poincaré A, 20 (1): 69, Bibcode:1974AIHPA..20...69T
- Thorne, Kip S. (1972), "Nonspherical Gravitational Collapse—A Short Review", in Klauder, J. (ed.), Magic without Magic, W. H. Freeman, pp. 231–258
- Thorne, Kip S. (1994), Black Holes and Time Warps: Einstein's Outrageous Legacy, W W Norton & Company, ISBN 978-0-393-31276-8
- Thorne, Kip S. (1995), "Gravitational radiation", Particle and Nuclear Astrophysics and Cosmology in the Next Millennium, p. 160, arXiv:gr-qc/9506086, Bibcode:1995pnac.conf..160T, ISBN 978-0-521-36853-7
- Thorne, Kip (2003). "Warping spacetime". In G.W. Gibbons; E.P.S. Shellard; S.J. Rankin (eds.). The future of theoretical physics and cosmology: celebrating Stephen Hawking's 60th birthday. Cambridge University Press. ISBN 978-0-521-82081-3.
- Townsend, Paul K. (1997). "Black Holes (Lecture notes)". arXiv:gr-qc/9707012.
- Townsend, Paul K. (1996). "Four Lectures on M-Theory". High Energy Physics and Cosmology. 13: 385. arXiv:hep-th/9612121. Bibcode:1997hepcbconf..385T.
- Traschen, Jennie (2000), Bytsenko, A.; Williams, F. (eds.), "An Introduction to Black Hole Evaporation", Mathematical Methods of Physics (Proceedings of the 1999 Londrina Winter School), World Scientific: 180, arXiv:gr-qc/0010055, Bibcode:2000mmp..conf..180T
- Trautman, Andrzej (2006), "Einstein–Cartan theory", in Françoise, J.-P.; Naber, G. L.; Tsou, S. T. (eds.), Encyclopedia of Mathematical Physics, Vol. 2, Elsevier, pp. 189–195, arXiv:gr-qc/0606062, Bibcode:2006gr.qc.....6062T
- Unruh, W. G. (1976), "Notes on Black Hole Evaporation", Phys. Rev. D, 14 (4): 870–892, Bibcode:1976PhRvD..14..870U, doi:10.1103/PhysRevD.14.870
- Veltman, Martinus (1975), "Quantum Theory of Gravitation", in Balian, Roger; Zinn-Justin, Jean (eds.), Methods in Field Theory – Les Houches Summer School in Theoretical Physics., vol. 77, North Holland
- Wald, Robert M. (1975), "On Particle Creation by Black Holes", Commun. Math. Phys., 45 (3): 9–34, Bibcode:1975CMaPh..45....9W, doi:10.1007/BF01609863, S2CID 120950657
- Wald, Robert M. (1984), General Relativity, University of Chicago Press, ISBN 978-0-226-87033-5
- Wald, Robert M. (1994), Quantum field theory in curved spacetime and black hole thermodynamics, University of Chicago Press, Bibcode:1994qftc.book.....W, ISBN 978-0-226-87027-4
- Wald, Robert M. (2001), "The Thermodynamics of Black Holes", Living Reviews in Relativity, 4 (1) 6, arXiv:gr-qc/9912119, Bibcode:2001LRR.....4....6W, doi:10.12942/lrr-2001-6, PMC 5253844, PMID 28163633
- Walsh, D.; Carswell, R. F.; Weymann, R. J. (1979), "0957 + 561 A, B: twin quasistellar objects or gravitational lens?", Nature, 279 (5712): 381–4, Bibcode:1979Natur.279..381W, doi:10.1038/279381a0, PMID 16068158, S2CID 2142707
- Wambsganss, Joachim (1998), "Gravitational Lensing in Astronomy", Living Reviews in Relativity, 1 (1) 12, arXiv:astro-ph/9812021, Bibcode:1998LRR.....1...12W, doi:10.12942/lrr-1998-12, PMC 5567250, PMID 28937183
- Weinberg, Steven (1972), Gravitation and Cosmology: Principles and Applications of the General Theory of Relativity, John Wiley, Bibcode:1972gcpa.book.....W, ISBN 978-0-471-92567-5
- Weinberg, Steven (1995), The Quantum Theory of Fields I: Foundations, Cambridge University Press, ISBN 978-0-521-55001-7
- Weinberg, Steven (1996), The Quantum Theory of Fields II: Modern Applications, Cambridge University Press, ISBN 978-0-521-55002-4
- Weinberg, Steven (2000), The Quantum Theory of Fields III: Supersymmetry, Cambridge University Press, ISBN 978-0-521-66000-6
- Weisberg, Joel M.; Taylor, Joseph H. (2003), "The Relativistic Binary Pulsar B1913+16"", in Bailes, M.; Nice, D. J.; Thorsett, S. E. (eds.), Proceedings of "Radio Pulsars," Chania, Crete, August, 2002, ASP Conference Series
- Weiss, Achim (2006), "Elements of the past: Big Bang Nucleosynthesis and observation", Einstein Online, Max Planck Institute for Gravitational Physics, archived from the original on 8 February 2007
- Wheeler, John A. (1990), A Journey Into Gravity and Spacetime, Scientific American Library, San Francisco: W. H. Freeman, ISBN 978-0-7167-6034-4
- Will, Clifford M. (1993), Theory and experiment in gravitational physics, Cambridge University Press, ISBN 978-0-521-43973-2
- Will, Clifford M. (2006), "The Confrontation between General Relativity and Experiment", Living Reviews in Relativity, 9 (1) 3, arXiv:gr-qc/0510072, Bibcode:2006LRR.....9....3W, doi:10.12942/lrr-2006-3, PMC 5256066, PMID 28179873
- Zwiebach, Barton (2004), A First Course in String Theory, Cambridge University Press, Bibcode:2004fcst.book.....Z, ISBN 978-0-521-83143-7
