= Richard Keatinge =

Richard Keatinge may refer to:

- Richard Harte Keatinge, Irish recipient of the Victoria Cross
- Richard Keatinge (judge), Irish barrister and judge

== See also ==
- Richard E. Keating, American astronomer
