= Hafele–Keating experiment =

Test of relativistic time dilation

Hafele and Keating aboard a commercial airliner, with two of the atomic clocks

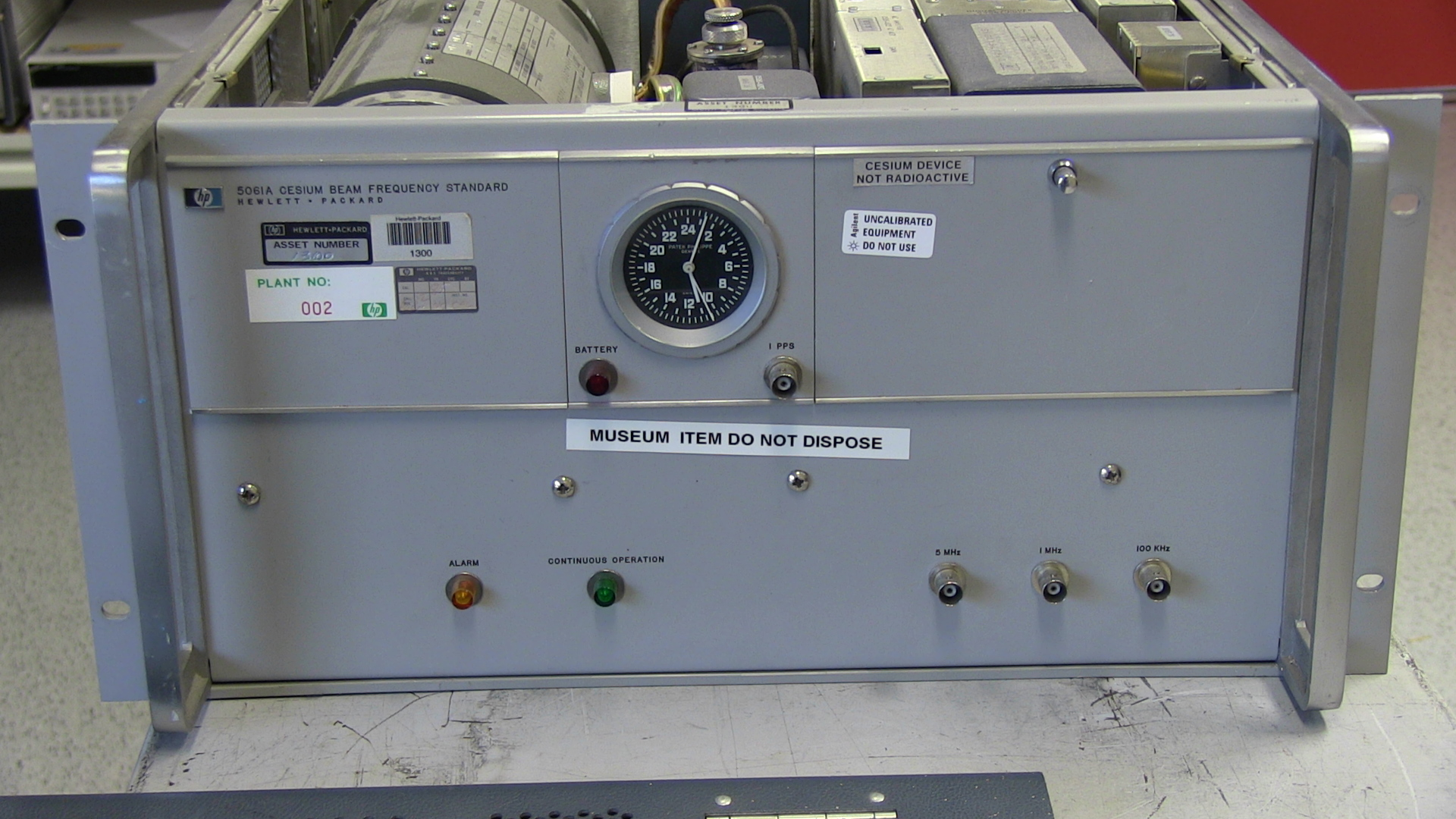
One of the actual HP 5061A Cesium Beam atomic clock units used in the Hafele–Keating experiment

The Hafele–Keating experiment was a test of the theory of relativity. In 1971, Joseph C. Hafele, a physicist, and Richard E. Keating, an astronomer, took four cesium-beam atomic clocks aboard commercial airliners. They flew twice around the world, first eastward, then westward, and compared the clocks in motion to stationary clocks at the United States Naval Observatory. When reunited, the three sets of clocks were found to disagree with one another, and their differences were consistent with the predictions of special and general relativity.

== Overview ==
=== Kinematic time dilation ===
According to special relativity, the rate of a clock is greatest according to an observer who is at rest with respect to the clock. In a frame of reference in which the clock is not at rest, the clock runs more slowly, as expressed by the Lorentz factor. This effect, called time dilation, has been confirmed in many tests of special relativity, such as the Ives–Stilwell experiment and others. Considering the Hafele–Keating experiment in a frame of reference at rest with respect to the center of the Earth (because this is an inertial frame), a clock aboard the plane moving eastward, in the direction of the Earth's rotation, had a greater velocity (resulting in a relative time loss) than one that remained on the ground, while a clock aboard the plane moving westward, against the Earth's rotation, had a lower velocity than one on the ground.

=== Gravitational time dilation ===
General relativity predicts an additional effect, in which an increase in gravitational potential due to altitude speeds the clocks up. That is, clocks at higher altitude tick faster than clocks on Earth's surface. This effect has been confirmed in many tests of general relativity, such as the Pound–Rebka experiment and Gravity Probe A. In the Hafele–Keating experiment, there was a slight increase in gravitational potential due to altitude that tended to speed the clocks back up. Since the aircraft flew at roughly the same altitude in both directions, this effect was approximately the same for the two planes, but nevertheless it caused a difference in comparison to the clocks on the ground.

=== Results ===
The results were published in Science in 1972:

	nanoseconds gained, predicted			nanoseconds gained, measured	difference
	gravitational (general relativity)	kinematic (special relativity)	total	nanoseconds gained, measured	difference
eastward	+144 ±14	−184 ±18	−40 ±23	−59 ±10	0.76 σ
westward	+179 ±18	+96 ±10	+275 ±21	+273 ±7	0.09 σ

The published outcome of the experiment was consistent with both special and general relativity. The observed time gains and losses were in agreement with relativistic predictions to within the ~10% precision expected of the experiment.

== Historical and scientific background ==
In his original 1905 paper on special relativity, Albert Einstein suggested a possible test of the theory: "Thence we conclude that a spring-clock at the equator must go more slowly, by a very small amount, than a precisely similar clock situated at one of the poles under otherwise identical conditions." Actually, it is now known that all clocks located at sea level on the Earth's surface tick at the same rate, regardless of latitude, because kinematic and gravitational time dilation effects cancel out (assuming that Earth's surface is an equipotential one). The kinematic effect was verified in the 1938 Ives–Stilwell experiment and in the 1940 Rossi–Hall experiment. General relativity's prediction of the gravitational effect was confirmed in 1959 by Pound and Rebka. These experiments, however, used subatomic particles, and were therefore less direct than the type of measurement with actual clocks as originally envisioned by Einstein.

Hafele, an assistant professor of physics at Washington University in St. Louis, was preparing notes for a physics lecture when he did a back-of-the-envelope calculation showing that an atomic clock aboard a commercial airliner should have sufficient precision to detect the predicted relativistic effects. He spent a year in fruitless attempts to get funding for such an experiment, until he was approached after a talk on the topic by Keating, an astronomer at the United States Naval Observatory who worked with atomic clocks.

Hafele and Keating obtained $8000 in funding from the Office of Naval Research for one of the most inexpensive tests ever conducted of general relativity. Of this amount, $7600 was spent on the eight round-the-world plane tickets, including two seats on each flight for "Mr. Clock." They flew eastward around the world, ran the clocks side by side for a week, and then flew westward. The crew of each flight helped by supplying the navigational data needed for the comparison with theory. In addition to the scientific papers published in Science, there were several accounts published in the popular press and other publications.

== Repetitions ==
A more complex and precise experiment of this kind was performed by a research group at the University of Maryland between September 1975 and January 1976. Three atomic clocks were brought to an altitude of 10 km above Chesapeake Bay in Maryland, and three other atomic clocks were at the ground. A turboprop plane was used, flying at only 500 km/h, in order to minimize the velocity effect. The plane was steadily observed using radar, and its position and velocity were measured every second. Five flights were carried out, each of 15 hours duration. Special containers protected the clocks from external influences such as vibrations, magnetic fields, or temperature variations. The time difference was measured by direct clock comparison at the ground before and after the flight, as well as during the flight by laser pulses of 0.1 ns duration. Those signals were sent to the plane, reflected, and again received at the ground station. The time difference was observable during the flight, before later analysis. An overall difference of 47.1 ns was measured, which consisted of the velocity effect of −5.7 ns and a gravitational effect of 52.8 ns. This agrees with the relativistic predictions to a precision of about 1.6%.

A reenactment of the original experiment by the National Physical Laboratory took place in 1996 on the 25th anniversary of the original experiment, using more precise atomic clocks during a flight from London to Washington, D.C. and back again. The results were verified to a higher degree of accuracy. A time gain of 39±2 ns was observed, compared to a relativistic prediction of 39.8 ns. In June 2010, the National Physical Laboratory again repeated the experiment, this time around the globe (London - Los Angeles - Auckland - Hong Kong - London). The predicted value was 246±3 ns, the measured value 230±20 ns.

Because the Hafele–Keating experiment has been reproduced by increasingly accurate methods, there has been a consensus among physicists since at least the 1970s that the relativistic predictions of gravitational and kinematic effects on time have been conclusively verified. Criticisms of the experiment did not address the subsequent verification of the result by more accurate methods, and have been shown to be in error.

== Similar experiments with atomic clocks ==
Measurements in which the only effect was gravitational have been conducted by Iijima et al. between 1975 and 1977. They carried a commercial cesium clock back and forth from the National Astronomical Observatory of Japan in Mitaka, at 58 m (190 ft) above sea level, to Norikura corona station, at 2,876 m (9,436 ft) above sea level, corresponding to an altitude difference of 2,818 m (9,245 ft). During the times when the clock stayed at Mitaka, it was compared with another cesium clock. The measured change in rate was (29±1.5)×10^{−14}, consistent with the result of 30.7×10^{−14} predicted by general relativity.

In 1976, Briatore and Leschiutta compared the rates of two cesium clocks, one in Turin 250 m (820 ft) above sea level, the other at Plateau Rosa 3,500 m (11,500 ft) above sea level. The comparison was conducted by evaluating the arrival times of VHF television synchronization pulses and of a LORAN-C chain. The predicted difference was 30.6 ns/d. Using two different operating criteria, they found differences of 33.8±6.8 ns/d and 36.5±5.8 ns/d, respectively, in agreement with general relativity.

In 2005, van Baak measured the gravitational time dilation of a weekend at 5400' ASL on Mount Rainier using two ensembles of three HP 5071A cesium beam clocks. He repeated the experiment in 2016 on Mount Lemmon for the television show Genius by Stephen Hawking.

In 2010, Chou et al. performed tests in which both gravitational and velocity effects were measured at velocities and gravitational potentials much smaller than those used in the mountain-valley experiments of the 1970s. It was possible to confirm velocity time dilation at the 10^{−16} level at speeds below 36 km/h. Also, gravitational time dilation was measured from a difference in elevation between two clocks of only 33 cm (13 in).

Presently both gravitational and velocity effects are routinely incorporated, for example, into the calculations used for the Global Positioning System.

== See also ==
- Twin paradox
- GPS time dilation
