= Hafele (surname) =

Hafele is a surname. Notable people with the surname include:

- Anna Häfele (born 1989), German ski jumper
- Joseph C. Hafele (1933–2014), American physicist
- Mathias Hafele (born 1983), Austrian former ski jumper
