= Jennie Traschen =

American physicist and cosmologist

Jennie Harriet Traschen is an American physicist and cosmologist whose research concerns the structure of the early universe, inflation, black holes and black hole thermodynamics, and quantum gravity. She is a professor of physics at the University of Massachusetts Amherst.

== Education and career ==
Traschen took three years to graduate from Averill Park High School in Rensselaer, New York, in 1974. She went to Rensselaer Polytechnic Institute with the support of a National Merit Scholarship and New York State Regent's Scholarship, graduating in 1977.

She traveled to the University of Cambridge on a Churchill Scholarship for the Mathematical Tripos, and earned a master's degree there. She returned to the US for doctoral study in general relativity at Harvard University, earning her Ph.D. in 1984.

She became a faculty member at Amherst after postdoctoral research at the University of Chicago and University of California, Santa Barbara.

== Research ==
Traschen's research has included work with Robert Geroch critiquing certain approximations used in string theory and defining a "maximally reasonable" class of Pseudo-Riemannian manifolds called the Geroch–Traschen metrics.

In black hole cosmology, Traschen is known for her work with David Kastor on multi-black-hole solutions to the equations of general relativity.

She is also known for her work in cosmological perturbation theory, on integral constraint vectors of spacelike hypersurfaces.

== Professional recognition ==
In 2006, Traschen was named a Fellow of the American Physical Society (APS), after a nomination from the APS Division of Gravitational Physics, "for her ground-breaking contributions to early universe cosmology and black hole physics".

== Political activism ==
In 2001, Traschen became infamous nationally for her suggestion at a meeting of the Amherst, Massachusetts select board that money from a fund for veteran services that had been used to purchase US flags would have been better spent on education and health care for veterans. The unfortunate timing of her remarks, the day before the September 11 attacks, and the inflammatory wording of her statement, led her to become a national "target of harassment and hate".

Traschen has also worked to encourage more women to enter theoretical physics, by organizing workshops aimed at greater inclusiveness and decrying the phenomenon in which some contributors to joint research are seen as invisible or negligible and excluded from recognition.

== Family and personal life ==
Traschen is the daughter of Isadore "Ike" Traschen, a professor of literature at the Rensselaer Polytechnic Institute and a leader in protests against the Vietnam War at Rensselaer. She is married to David Kastor, also a physicist at UMass Amherst. Their daughter, Kalyani Kastor, is a professional illustrator.
