= Experimental testing of time dilation =

Tests of special relativity

Relation between the speed and the Lorentz factor γ (and hence the time dilation of moving clocks).

Time dilation as predicted by special relativity is often verified by means of particle lifetime experiments. According to special relativity, the rate of a clock C traveling between two synchronized laboratory clocks A and B, as seen by a laboratory observer, is slowed relative to the laboratory clock rates. Since any periodic process can be considered a clock, the lifetimes of unstable particles such as muons must also be affected, so that moving muons should have a longer lifetime than resting ones. A variety of experiments confirming this effect have been performed both in the atmosphere and in particle accelerators. Another type of time dilation experiments is the group of Ives–Stilwell experiments measuring the relativistic Doppler effect.

== Atmospheric tests ==
Minkowski diagram

a) View in S

b) View in S′

c) Loedel diagram (In order to make the differences smaller, 0.7c was used instead of 0.995c)

=== Theory ===
The emergence of the muons is caused by the collision of cosmic rays with the upper atmosphere, after which the muons reach Earth. The probability that muons can reach the Earth depends on their half-life, which itself is modified by the relativistic corrections of two quantities: a) the mean lifetime of muons and b) the length between the upper and lower atmosphere (at Earth's surface). This allows for a direct application of length contraction upon the atmosphere at rest in inertial frame S, and time dilation upon the muons at rest in S′.

Time dilation and length contraction

Length of the atmosphere: The contraction formula is given by $L=L_{0}/\gamma$, where L_{0} is the proper length of the atmosphere and L its contracted length. As the atmosphere is at rest in S, we have γ=1 and its proper Length L_{0} is measured. As it is in motion in S′, we have γ>1 and its contracted length L′ is measured.

Decay time of muons: The time dilation formula is $T=\gamma \ T_{0}$, where T_{0} is the proper time of a clock comoving with the muon, corresponding with the mean decay time of the muon in its proper frame. As the muon is at rest in S′, we have γ=1 and its proper time T′_{0} is measured. As it is moving in S, we have γ>1, therefore its proper time is shorter with respect to time T. (For comparison's sake, another muon at rest on Earth can be considered, called muon-S. Therefore, its decay time in S is shorter than that of muon-S′, while it is longer in S′.)

- In S, muon-S′ has a longer decay time than muon-S. Therefore, muon-S' has sufficient time to pass the proper length of the atmosphere in order to reach Earth.
- In S′, muon-S has a longer decay time than muon-S′. But this is no problem, since the atmosphere is contracted with respect to its proper length. Therefore, even the faster decay time of muon-S′ suffices in order to be passed by the moving atmosphere and to be reached by Earth.

Minkowski diagram

The muon emerges at the origin (A) by collision of radiation with the upper atmosphere. The muon is at rest in S′, so its worldline is the ct′-axis. The upper atmosphere is at rest in S, so its worldline is the ct-axis. Upon the axes of x and x′, all events are present that are simultaneous with A in S and S′, respectively. The muon and Earth are meeting at D. As the Earth is at rest in S, its worldline (identical with the lower atmosphere) is drawn parallel to the ct-axis, until it intersects the axes of x′ and x.

Time: The interval between two events present on the worldline of a single clock is called proper time, an important invariant of special relativity. As the origin of the muon at A and the encounter with Earth at D is on the muon's worldline, only a clock comoving with the muon and thus resting in S′ can indicate the proper time T′_{0}=AD. Due to its invariance, also in S it is agreed that this clock is indicating exactly that time between the events, and because it is in motion here, T′_{0}=AD is shorter than time T indicated by clocks resting in S. This can be seen at the longer intervals T=BD=AE parallel to the ct-axis.

Length: Event B, where the worldline of Earth intersects the x-axis, corresponds in S to the position of Earth simultaneous with the emergence of the muon. C, where the Earth's worldline intersects the x′-axis, corresponds in S′ to the position of Earth simultaneous with the emergence of the muon. Length L_{0}=AB in S is longer than length L′=AC in S′.

=== Experiments ===
Results of the Frisch–Smith experiment. Curves computed for $M_{\mathrm{Newton}}$ and $M_{\mathrm{SR}}$.

If no time dilation exists, then those muons should decay in the upper regions of the atmosphere, however, as a consequence of time dilation they are present in considerable amount also at much lower heights. The comparison of those amounts allows for the determination of the mean lifetime as well as the half-life of muons. $N$ is the number of muons measured in the upper atmosphere, $M$ at sea level, $Z$ is the travel time in the rest frame of the Earth by which the muons traverse the distance between those regions, and $T_0$ is the mean proper lifetime of the muons:

$$\begin{align}
M_{\mathrm{Newton}} & =N\exp\left[-Z/T_{0}\right]\\
M_{\mathrm{SR}} & =N\exp\left[-Z/\left(\gamma T_{0}\right)\right]
\end{align}$$

==== Rossi–Hall experiment ====
In 1940 at Echo Lake (3240 m) and Denver in Colorado (1616 m), Bruno Rossi and D. B. Hall measured the relativistic decay of muons (which they thought were mesons). They measured muons in the atmosphere traveling above 0.99 c (c being the speed of light). Rossi and Hall confirmed the formulas for relativistic momentum and time dilation in a qualitative manner. Knowing the momentum and lifetime of moving muons enabled them to compute their mean proper lifetime too – they obtained ≈ 2.4 μs (modern experiments improved this result to ≈ 2.2 μs).

==== Frisch–Smith experiment ====
A much more precise experiment of this kind was conducted by David H. Frisch and Smith (1962) and documented by a film. They measured approximately 563 muons per hour in six runs on Mount Washington at 1917m above sea-level. By measuring their kinetic energy, mean muon velocities between 0.995 c and 0.9954 c were determined. Another measurement was taken in Cambridge, Massachusetts at sea-level. The time the muons need from 1917m to 0m should be about 6.4 μs. Assuming a mean lifetime of 2.2 μs, only 27 muons would reach this location per hour if there were no time dilation. However, approximately 412 muons per hour arrived in Cambridge, resulting in a time dilation factor of 8.8±0.8.

Frisch and Smith showed that this is in agreement with the predictions of special relativity: The time dilation factor for muons on Mount Washington traveling at 0.995 c to 0.9954 c is approximately 10.2. Their kinetic energy and thus their velocity was diminished until they reached the elevation of Cambridge to 0.9881 c and 0.9897 c due to the interaction with the atmosphere, reducing the dilation factor to 6.8. So between the start (≈ 10.2) and the target (≈ 6.8) an average time dilation factor of 8.4±2 was determined by them, in agreement with the measured result within the margin of errors (see the above formulas and the image for computing the decay curves).

==== Other experiments ====
Since then, many measurements of the mean lifetime of muons in the atmosphere and time dilation have been conducted in undergraduate experiments.

== Accelerator and atomic clock tests ==
=== Time dilation and CPT symmetry ===
Much more precise measurements of particle decays have been made in particle accelerators using muons and different types of particles. Besides the confirmation of time dilation, also CPT symmetry was confirmed by comparing the lifetimes of positive and negative particles. This symmetry requires that the decay rates of particles and their antiparticles have to be the same. A violation of CPT invariance would also lead to violations of Lorentz invariance and thus special relativity.

Pion	Kaon	Muon
Durbin et al. (1952) Eckhause et al. (1965) Nordberg et al. (1967) Greenburg et al. (1969) Ayres et al. (1971)	Burrowes et al. (1959) Nordin (1961) Boyarski et al. (1962) Lobkowicz et al. (1969) Ott et al. (1971) Skjeggestad et al. (1971) Geweniger et al. (1974) Carithers et al. (1975)	Lundy (1962) Meyer et al. (1963) Eckhause et al. (1963) Balandin et al. (1974)

Today, time dilation of particles is routinely confirmed in particle accelerators along with tests of relativistic energy and momentum, and its consideration is obligatory in the analysis of particle experiments at relativistic velocities.

=== Twin paradox and moving clocks ===
Bailey et al. (1977) measured the lifetime of positive and negative muons sent around a loop in the CERN Muon storage ring. This experiment confirmed both time dilation and the twin paradox, i.e. the hypothesis that clocks sent away and coming back to their initial position are slowed with respect to a resting clock. Other measurements of the twin paradox involve gravitational time dilation as well.

In the Hafele–Keating experiment, actual cesium-beam atomic clocks were flown around the world and the expected differences were found compared to a stationary clock.

=== Clock hypothesis – lack of effect of acceleration ===
The clock hypothesis states that the extent of acceleration does not influence the value of time dilation. In most of the former experiments mentioned above, the decaying particles were in an inertial frame, i.e. unaccelerated. However, in Bailey et al. (1977) the particles were subject to a transverse acceleration of up to ~10^{18} g. Since the result was the same, it was shown that acceleration has no impact on time dilation. In addition, Roos et al. (1980) measured the decay of Sigma baryons, which were subject to a longitudinal acceleration between 0.5 and 5.0 × 10^{15} g. Again, no deviation from ordinary time dilation was measured.

== See also ==
- Tests of special relativity
