= Gowdy solution =

Solutions to Einstein field equations

Gowdy universes or, alternatively, Gowdy solutions of Einstein's equations are simple model spacetimes in general relativity which represent an expanding universe filled with a regular pattern of gravitational waves.
