= Joseph C. Hafele =

American physicist (1933–2014)

- Born: July 25, 1933; Peoria, Illinois
- Died: November 15, 2014 (aged 81); Loveland, Colorado
- Education: University of Illinois at Urbana-Champaign (B.Sc., Ph.D.)
- Known for: Hafele–Keating experiment
- Spouse: Carol Hessling

Joseph Carl Hafele (25 July 1933 – 15 November 2014) was an American physicist best known for the Hafele–Keating experiment, a test of Einstein's theory of general relativity.

Hafele was an apprentice welder when he was drafted to serve in the army during the Korean War. After the war, he obtained undergraduate and graduate degrees from the University of Illinois at Urbana-Champaign, earning his PhD in 1962 with a thesis on a topic in nuclear physics. He married Carol Hessling in 1958, and they had four daughters. He worked at Los Alamos National Laboratory, and then Washington University in St. Louis from 1966 to 1972. In 1971 he performed the Hafele-Keating experiment along with astronomer Richard E. Keating. He later worked at Caterpillar, Eureka College, NASA (Langley Air Force Base), and Christopher Newport University. After his retirement in 1996 he and his wife lived in Laramie, Wyoming, where he continued theoretical work on the interpretation of experiments that might indicate anomalies in relativity. He died in 2014 during surgery.

== Publications ==
- Hafele, J. C. (1970). "Relativistic Behaviour of Moving Terrestrial Clocks". Nature. 227 (5255): 270–271. Bibcode:1970Natur.227..270H. doi:10.1038/227270a0. PMID 16057915. S2CID 4146226.
- Hafele, J. C. (1972). "Relativistic Time for Terrestrial Circumnavigations". American Journal of Physics. 40 (1): 81–85. Bibcode:1972AmJPh..40...81H. doi:10.1119/1.1986450. S2CID 122110181.
- Hafele, J.C.; Keating, R.E. (July 14, 1972). "Around-the-World Atomic Clocks: Predicted Relativistic Time Gains". Science. 177 (4044): 166–168. Bibcode:1972Sci...177..166H. doi:10.1126/science.177.4044.166. PMID 17779917. S2CID 10067969.
- Hafele, J.C.; Keating, R.E. (1972). "Around-the-World Atomic Clocks: Observed Relativistic Time Gains". Science. 177 (4044): 168–170. Bibcode:1972Sci...177..168H. doi:10.1126/science.177.4044.168. PMID 17779918. S2CID 37376002.
