= Richard E. Keating =

American astronomer

Richard E. Keating (29 May 1941 – 5 Oct 2006) was an American astronomer best known for the Hafele–Keating experiment, a test of Einstein's theory of relativity performed while he was working at the United States Naval Observatory.
