= Einstein–Hilbert action =

Concept in general relativity

The Einstein–Hilbert action in general relativity yields the Einstein field equations through the principle of stationary action. With the $(-, +, +, +)$ metric signature, the gravitational part of the action is given as

$$S = {1 \over 2\kappa} \int R \sqrt{-g} \, \mathrm{d}^4x,$$

where $g=\det(g_{\mu\nu})$ is the determinant of the metric tensor matrix, $R$ is the Ricci scalar, and $\kappa = 8\pi Gc^{-4}$ is the Einstein gravitational constant, $G$ is the gravitational constant and $c$ is the speed of light in vacuum. If it converges, the integral is taken over the whole spacetime. If it does not converge, $S$ is no longer well-defined, but a modified definition where one integrates over arbitrarily large, relatively compact domains, still yields the Einstein equation as the Euler–Lagrange equation of the Einstein–Hilbert action. The action was proposed by David Hilbert in 1915 as part of his application of the variational principle to a combination of gravity and electromagnetism.

== Discussion ==
Deriving equations of motion from an action has several advantages. First, it allows for easy unification of general relativity with other classical field theories (such as Maxwell theory), which are also formulated in terms of an action. In the process, the derivation identifies a natural candidate for the source term coupling the metric to matter fields. Moreover, symmetries of the action allow for easy identification of conserved quantities through Noether's theorem.

In general relativity, the action is usually assumed to be a functional of the metric (and matter fields), and the connection is given by the Levi-Civita connection. The Palatini formulation of general relativity assumes the metric and connection to be independent, and varies with respect to both independently, which makes it possible to include fermionic matter fields with non-integer spin.

The Einstein equations in the presence of matter are given by adding the matter action to the Einstein–Hilbert action.

== Derivation of Einstein field equations ==
Suppose that the full action of the theory is given by the Einstein–Hilbert term plus a term $\mathcal{L}_\mathrm{M}$ describing any matter fields appearing in the theory,

$S = \int \left[ \frac{1}{2\kappa} R + \mathcal{L}_\mathrm{M} \right] \sqrt{-g} \, \mathrm{d}^4 x$.	1

Requiring the variation of this action with respect to the inverse metric be zero yields

$$\begin{align}
0 &= \delta S \\[6pt]
&= \int \left[ \frac{1}{2\kappa} \frac{\delta \left(\sqrt{-g}R\right)}{\delta g^{\mu\nu}} + \frac{\delta \left(\sqrt{-g} \mathcal{L}_\mathrm{M}\right)}{\delta g^{\mu\nu}}
\right] \delta g^{\mu\nu} \, \mathrm{d}^4x \\[6pt]
&= \int \left[ \frac{1}{2\kappa} \left( \frac{\delta R}{\delta g^{\mu\nu}} + \frac{R}{\sqrt{-g}} \frac{\delta \sqrt{-g}}{\delta g^{\mu\nu}}
\right) + \frac{1}{\sqrt{-g}} \frac{\delta \left(\sqrt{-g} \mathcal{L}_\mathrm{M}\right)}{\delta g^{\mu\nu}} \right] \delta g^{\mu\nu} \sqrt{-g}\, \mathrm{d}^4x.
\end{align}$$.

Since this equation should hold for any variation $\delta g^{\mu\nu}$, it implies that

$\frac{\delta R}{\delta g^{\mu\nu}} + \frac{R}{\sqrt{-g}} \frac{\delta \sqrt{-g}}{\delta g^{\mu\nu}} = -2\kappa \frac{1}{\sqrt{-g}} \frac{\delta (\sqrt{-g} \mathcal{L}_\mathrm{M})}{\delta g^{\mu\nu}}$	2

is the equation of motion for the metric field. The right hand side of this equation is (by definition) proportional to the stress–energy tensor,

$$T_{\mu\nu} := \frac{-2}{\sqrt{-g}}\frac{\delta (\sqrt{-g} \mathcal{L}_\mathrm{M})}{\delta g^{\mu\nu}} = -2 \frac{\delta \mathcal{L}_\mathrm{M}}{\delta g^{\mu\nu}} + g_{\mu\nu} \mathcal{L}_\mathrm{M}$$.

To calculate the left hand side of the equation we need the variations of the Ricci scalar $R$ and the determinant of the metric. These can be obtained by standard textbook calculations such as the one given below, which is strongly based on the one given in Carroll (2004).

=== Variation of the Ricci scalar ===
The variation of the Ricci scalar follows from varying the Riemann curvature tensor, and then the Ricci curvature tensor.

The first step is captured by the Palatini identity

$$\delta R_{\sigma\nu} \equiv \delta {R^\rho}_{\sigma\rho\nu} =
\nabla_\rho \left( \delta \Gamma^\rho_{\nu\sigma} \right) - \nabla_\nu \left( \delta \Gamma^\rho_{\rho\sigma} \right)$$.

Using the product rule, the variation of the Ricci scalar $R = g^{\sigma\nu} R_{\sigma\nu}$ then becomes

$$\begin{align}
\delta R &= R_{\sigma\nu} \delta g^{\sigma\nu} + g^{\sigma\nu} \delta R_{\sigma\nu}\\[6pt]
&= R_{\sigma\nu} \delta g^{\sigma\nu} + \nabla_\rho \left( g^{\sigma\nu} \delta\Gamma^\rho_{\nu\sigma} - g^{\sigma\rho} \delta \Gamma^\mu_{\mu\sigma} \right),
\end{align}$$

where we also used the metric compatibility $\nabla_\sigma g^{\mu\nu} = 0$, and renamed the summation indices $(\rho,\nu) \rightarrow (\mu,\rho)$ in the last term.

When multiplied by $\sqrt{-g}$, the term $\nabla_\rho \left( g^{\sigma\nu} \delta\Gamma^\rho_{\nu\sigma} - g^{\sigma\rho}\delta\Gamma^\mu_{\mu\sigma} \right)$ becomes a total derivative, since for any vector $A^\lambda$ and any tensor density $\sqrt{-g}\,A^\lambda$, we have

$$\sqrt{-g} \, \nabla_\mu A^\mu =
\nabla_\mu\left(\sqrt{-g} \, A^\mu\right) =
\partial_\mu\left(\sqrt{-g} \, A^\mu\right)$$.

By Stokes' theorem, this only yields a boundary term when integrated. The boundary term is in general non-zero, because the integrand depends not only on $\delta g^{\mu\nu},$ but also on its partial derivatives $\partial_\lambda\, \delta g^{\mu\nu} \equiv \delta\, \partial_\lambda g^{\mu\nu}$; see the article Gibbons–Hawking–York boundary term for details. However, when the variation of the metric $\delta g^{\mu\nu}$ vanishes in a neighbourhood of the boundary or when there is no boundary, this term does not contribute to the variation of the action. Thus, we can forget about this term and simply obtain

$\frac{\delta R}{\delta g^{\mu\nu}} = R_{\mu\nu}$.	3

at events not in the closure of the boundary.

=== Variation of the determinant ===
Jacobi's formula, the rule for differentiating a determinant, gives:

$$\delta g = \delta \det(g_{\mu\nu}) = g g^{\mu\nu} \delta g_{\mu\nu}$$,

or one could transform to a coordinate system where $g_{\mu\nu}$ is diagonal and then apply the product rule to differentiate the product of factors on the main diagonal. Using this we get

$$\delta \sqrt{-g} = -\frac{1}{2\sqrt{-g}}\delta g = \frac{1}{2} \sqrt{-g} \left( g^{\mu\nu} \delta g_{\mu\nu} \right) = -\frac{1}{2} \sqrt{-g} \left( g_{\mu\nu} \delta g^{\mu\nu} \right)$$

In the last equality we used the fact that

$$g_{\mu\nu}\delta g^{\mu\nu} = -g^{\mu\nu} \delta g_{\mu\nu}$$

which follows from the rule for differentiating the inverse of a matrix

$$\delta g^{\mu\nu} = - g^{\mu\alpha} \left( \delta g_{\alpha\beta} \right) g^{\beta\nu}$$.

Thus we conclude that

$\frac{1}{\sqrt{-g}} \frac{\delta \sqrt{-g}}{\delta g^{\mu\nu} } = -\frac{1}{2} g_{\mu\nu}$.	4

=== Equation of motion ===
Now that we have all the necessary variations at our disposal, we can insert (3) and (4) into the equation of motion (2) for the metric field to obtain

$R_{\mu\nu} - \frac{1}{2} g_{\mu\nu} R = \frac{8 \pi G}{c^4} T_{\mu\nu}$,	5

which is the Einstein field equations, and

$$\kappa = \frac{8\pi G}{c^4}$$

has been chosen such that the non-relativistic limit yields the usual form of Newton's law of gravity, where $G$ is the gravitational constant (see here for details).

== Cosmological constant ==
When a cosmological constant $\Lambda$ is included in the Lagrangian, the action becomes

$$S = \int \left[ \frac{1}{2\kappa} (R-2 \Lambda ) + \mathcal{L}_\mathrm{M} \right] \sqrt{-g} \, \mathrm{d}^4 x.$$

Taking variations with respect to the inverse metric:

$$\begin{align}
\delta S
&= \int \left[ \frac{\sqrt{-g}}{2\kappa} \frac{\delta R}{\delta g^{\mu \nu}} + \frac{R}{2\kappa} \frac{\delta \sqrt{-g}}{\delta g^{\mu \nu}} - \frac{\Lambda}{\kappa} \frac{\delta \sqrt{-g}}{\delta g^{\mu \nu}} + \sqrt{-g}\frac{\delta \mathcal{L}_\mathrm{M}}{\delta g^{\mu \nu}} + \mathcal{L}_\mathrm{M} \frac{\delta \sqrt{-g}}{\delta g^{\mu \nu}} \right] \delta g^{\mu \nu} \mathrm{d}^4 x \\[6pt]
&= \int \left[ \frac{1}{2\kappa} \frac{\delta R}{\delta g^{\mu \nu}} + \frac{R}{2\kappa} \frac{1}{\sqrt{-g}} \frac{\delta \sqrt{-g}}{\delta g^{\mu \nu}} - \frac{\Lambda}{\kappa} \frac{1}{\sqrt{-g}} \frac{\delta \sqrt{-g}}{\delta g^{\mu \nu}} + \frac{\delta \mathcal{L}_\mathrm{M}}{\delta g^{\mu \nu}} + \frac{\mathcal{L}_\mathrm{M}}{\sqrt{-g}} \frac{\delta \sqrt{-g}}{\delta g^{\mu \nu}} \right] \delta g^{\mu \nu} \sqrt{-g} \, \mathrm{d}^4 x.
\end{align}$$

Using the action principle:

$$0 = \delta S =
\frac{1}{2\kappa} \frac{\delta R}{\delta g^{\mu \nu}} + \frac{R}{2\kappa} \frac{1}{\sqrt{-g}} \frac{\delta \sqrt{-g}}{\delta g^{\mu \nu}} -
\frac{\Lambda}{\kappa} \frac{1}{\sqrt{-g}} \frac{\delta \sqrt{-g}}{\delta g^{\mu \nu}} + \frac{\delta \mathcal{L}_\mathrm{M}}{\delta g^{\mu \nu}} +
\frac{\mathcal{L}_\mathrm{M}}{\sqrt{-g}} \frac{\delta \sqrt{-g}}{\delta g^{\mu \nu}}$$

Combining this expression with the results obtained before:

$$\begin{align}
\frac{\delta R}{\delta g^{\mu \nu}} &= R_{\mu \nu} \\[6pt]
\frac{1}{\sqrt{-g}} \frac{\delta \sqrt{-g}}{\delta g^{\mu \nu}} &= \frac{-g_{\mu \nu}}{2} \\[6pt]
T_{\mu \nu} &= \mathcal{L}_\mathrm{M} g_{\mu \nu} - 2 \frac{\delta\mathcal{L}_\mathrm{M}}{\delta g^{\mu \nu}}
\end{align}$$

We can obtain:

$$\begin{align}
\frac{1}{2\kappa} R_{\mu \nu} + \frac{R}{2\kappa} \frac{-g_{\mu \nu}}{2} - \frac{\Lambda}{\kappa} \frac{-g_{\mu \nu}}{2} +  \left(\frac{\delta \mathcal{L}_\mathrm{M}}{\delta g^{\mu \nu}} + \mathcal{L}_\mathrm{M}\frac{-g_{\mu \nu}}{2} \right) &= 0 \\[6pt]
R_{\mu \nu} - \frac{R}{2} g_{\mu \nu} + \Lambda g_{\mu \nu} + \kappa \left(2 \frac{\delta \mathcal{L}_\mathrm{M}}{\delta g^{\mu \nu}} - \mathcal{L}_\mathrm{M}g_{\mu \nu} \right) &= 0 \\[6pt]
R_{\mu \nu} - \frac{R}{2} g_{\mu \nu} + \Lambda g_{\mu \nu} - \kappa T_{\mu \nu} &= 0
\end{align}$$

With $\kappa = \dfrac{8 \pi G}{c^4}$, the expression becomes the field equations with a cosmological constant:

$$R_{\mu \nu} - \frac{1}{2} g_{\mu \nu} R + \Lambda g_{\mu \nu} = \frac{8 \pi G}{c^4} T_{\mu \nu}.$$

== See also ==
- Belinfante–Rosenfeld tensor
- Brans–Dicke theory (in which the constant k is replaced by a scalar field).
- Einstein–Cartan theory
- f(R) gravity (in which the Ricci scalar is replaced by a function of the Ricci curvature)
- Gibbons–Hawking–York boundary term
- Kaluza–Klein theory
- Komar superpotential
- Palatini action
- Teleparallelism
- Tetradic Palatini action
- Variational methods in general relativity
- Vermeil's theorem

== Bibliography ==
- Misner, Charles W.; Thorne, Kip. S.; Wheeler, John A. (1973), Gravitation, W. H. Freeman, ISBN 978-0-7167-0344-0
- Wald, Robert M. (1984), General Relativity, University of Chicago Press, ISBN 978-0-226-87033-5
- Carroll, Sean M. (2004), Spacetime and Geometry: An Introduction to General Relativity, San Francisco: Addison-Wesley, ISBN 978-0-8053-8732-2
- Hilbert, D. (1915) Die Grundlagen der Physik (German original for free) (English translation for $25), Konigl. Gesell. d. Wiss. Göttingen, Nachr. Math.-Phys. Kl. 395–407
- Sokolov, D.D. (2001) [1994], "Cosmological constant", Encyclopedia of Mathematics, EMS Press
- Feynman, Richard P. (1995), Feynman Lectures on Gravitation, Addison-Wesley, ISBN 0-201-62734-5
- Christopher M. Hirata Lecture 33: Lagrangian formulation of GR (27 April 2012).
