= Einstein Gravity in a Nutshell =

Textbook by Anthony Zee

- Author: Anthony Zee
- Subject: General relativity
- Genre: Non-fiction
- Publisher: Princeton University Press
- Publication date: May 5, 2013
- Publication place: United States
- Media type: Print
- Pages: xxii + 888
- ISBN: 978-0-691-14558-7
- Website: https://www.kitp.ucsb.edu/zee/books/einstein-gravity

Einstein Gravity in a Nutshell is a textbook by Anthony Zee. It is intended for undergraduates enrolled in a course on general relativity, autodidacts, as well as physicists who wish to learn or review this subject. It assumes familiarity with classical mechanics and electrodynamics, but not quantum mechanics, quantum field theory, or differential geometry.

The book begins with elementary considerations—even discussing units of some fundamental constants, namely Newton's gravitational constant $G$, the speed of light in vacuum $c$, and the reduced Planck constant $\hslash$—before exploring the relevance of relativity, curved spacetime, and differential geometry. Most standard topics in general relativity are covered. Towards the end of the book, Zee covers a number of advanced topics, including those not yet well established, such as conformal transformations, topological field theory, and the Kaluza-Klein theory. Zee emphasizes the use of action and symmetry.

== Contents ==
- Book I: From Newton to the Gravitational Redshift
  - Part I: From Newton to Riemann: Coordinates to Curvature
  - Part II: Action, Symmetry, and Conservation
  - Part III: Space and Time Unified
  - Part IV: Electromagnetism and Gravity
- Book Two: From the Happiest Thought to the Universe
  - Part V: Equivalence Principle and Curved Spacetime
  - Part VI: Einstein's Field Equation Derived and Put to Work
  - Part VII: Black Holes
  - Part VIII: Introduction to Our Universe
- Book Three: Gravity at Work and at Play
  - Part IX: Aspects of Gravity
  - Part X: Gravity Past, Present, and Future
- Closing Words
- Timeline of Some of the People Mentioned
- Solutions to Selected Exercises
- Bibliography
- Index
- Collections of Formulas and Conventions

== Reception ==
Michael Berg wrote in his review for the Mathematical Association of America that like its predecessor, Einstein Gravity in a Nutshell is rather appealing, even though it not mathematically rigorous. Berg found Zee's "chatty" style to be insightful and he enjoyed the historical anecdotes throughout the book.

Luboš Motl opined in his blog The Reference Frame that this is an entertaining and helpful book for readers at various levels, including gifted students in high school, comparing it to The Feynman Lectures on Physics. While some readers might think that Einstein Gravity in a Nutshell is more sophisticated than Gravity (2002) by James Hartle but less so than Spacetime and Geometry (2003) by Sean Michael Carroll, according to Motl, Zee's text dwelled deeper into general relativity than most other introductory texts and offered many clever analogies and exercises.

Thomas Peters of the University of Zurich praised the Einstein Gravity in a Nutshell as a unique and transparent presentation of the materials, beautifully typeset and richly illustrated. He commended its practical introduction to differential geometry that avoided unnecessary mathematical complications, building upon coordinate transformations and the classical differential geometry of surfaces and curves as an illustration. He noted that the book incorporated all the standard topics of general relativity, with the notable exception of gravitational lensing, as well as some advanced ones, such as Penrose diagrams.

== See also ==
- Quantum Field Theory in a Nutshell (2003) by the same author
- Gravitation (1973) by John Wheeler, Charles Misner, and Kip Thorne
- General Relativity (1984) by Robert Wald
- Spacetime and Geometry (2003) by Sean Michael Carroll
- List of books on general relativity
