= Geometrized unit system =

Unit system used in the physics of relativity

A geometrized unit system or geometrodynamic unit system is a system of natural units in which the base physical units are chosen so that the speed of light in vacuum (c), and the gravitational constant (G), are used as defining constants.

The geometrized unit system is not a completely defined system. Some systems are geometrized unit systems in the sense that they set these two constants, in addition to other constants, to unity, for example Stoney units and Planck units.

This system is used in physics, especially in the special and general theories of relativity, which focus on physical quantities that are identified with dynamic quantities such as time, length, mass, dimensionless quantities, area, energy, momentum, path curvatures and sectional curvatures.

Many equations in relativistic physics appear simpler when expressed in geometrized units, because all occurrences of G and of c "drop out". For example, the Schwarzschild radius of a nonrotating uncharged black hole with mass m becomes r_{s} = 2m. For this reason, many books and papers on relativistic physics use geometrized units. An alternative "rationalized" system of geometrized units is often used in particle physics and cosmology, in which 4πG or 8πG are used instead. This makes equations such as the Einstein field equations, the Einstein–Hilbert action, the Friedmann equations and the Newtonian Poisson equation seem simpler and more natural.

== Definition ==
Geometrized units were defined in the book Gravitation by Misner, Thorne, and Wheeler such that the speed of light c, the gravitational constant G, and Boltzmann constant k_{B} are all "set to 1". Some authors refer to these units as geometrodynamic units.

In geometrized units, every time interval is interpreted as the distance travelled by light during that given time interval. That is, one second is interpreted as one light-second, so time has the geometrized units of length. This is dimensionally consistent with the notion that, according to the kinematical laws of special relativity, time and distance are on an equal footing.

Energy and momentum are interpreted as components of the four-momentum vector, and invariant mass is the magnitude of this vector, so in geometrized units these must all have the dimension of length. We can convert a mass expressed in kilograms to the equivalent mass expressed in metres by multiplying by the conversion factor G/c^{2}. For example, the Sun's mass of 2.0×10^{30} kg in SI units is equivalent to 1.5 km. This is half the Schwarzschild radius of a one solar mass black hole. All other conversion factors can be worked out by combining these two.

The small numerical size of the few conversion factors reflects the fact that relativistic effects are only noticeable when large masses or high speeds are considered.

== Conversions ==
Listed below are all conversion factors that are useful to convert between combinations of the SI base units, based on the constants c, G, ε_{0} (vacuum permittivity) and k_{B} (Boltzmann constant).

	m	kg	s	C	K
m	1	c^{2}/G [kg/m]	1/c [s/m]	c^{2}/(G/ε_{0})^{1/2} [C/m]	c^{4}/(Gk_{B}) [K/m]
kg	G/c^{2} [m/kg]	1	G/c^{3} [s/kg]	(Gε_{0})^{1/2} [C/kg]	c^{2}/k_{B} [K/kg]
s	c [m/s]	c^{3}/G [kg/s]	1	c^{3}/(G/ε_{0})^{1/2} [C/s]	c^{5}/(Gk_{B}) [K/s]
C	(G/ε_{0})^{1/2}/c^{2} [m/C]	1/(Gε_{0})^{1/2} [kg/C]	(G/ε_{0})^{1/2}/c^{3} [s/C]	1	c^{2}/(k_{B}(Gε_{0})^{1/2}) [K/C]
K	Gk_{B}/c^{4} [m/K]	k_{B}/c^{2} [kg/K]	Gk_{B}/c^{5} [s/K]	k_{B}(Gε_{0})^{1/2}/c^{2} [C/K]	1
