= An Introduction to Quantum Field Theory =

Physics textbook (1995)

- Author: Michael Peskin; Daniel V. Schroeder
- Language: English
- Subject: Quantum field theory Particle physics
- Publisher: Addison-Wesley
- Publication date: 1995
- Publication place: Massachusetts, United States
- ISBN: 0-201-50397-2

An Introduction to Quantum Field Theory is a graduate textbook on quantum field theory and particle physics, written by Michael Peskin and Daniel V. Schroeder. Commonly known as Peskin and Schroeder for short, it was originally published by Addison-Wesley in 1995.

== Table of contents ==
The book is divided into three portions. The first covers quantum electrodynamics using Feynman diagrams, the second the Wilsonian approach to renormalization, and the third non-Abelian gauge theories and the Standard Model. These parts are divided into chapters as follows:

1. Feynman Diagrams and Quantum Electrodynamics
  1. Invitation: Pair Production in e^{+} e^{-} Annihilation
  2. The Klein–Gordon Field
  3. The Dirac Field
  4. Interacting Fields and Feynman Diagrams
  5. Elementary Processes of Quantum Electrodynamics
  6. Radiative Corrections: Introduction
  7. Radiative Corrections: Some Formal Developments
    Final Project: Radiation of Gluon Jets
2. Renormalization
  8. Invitation: Ultraviolet Cutoffs and Critical Fluctuations
  9. Functional Methods
  10. Systematics of Renormalization
  11. Renormalization and Symmetry
  12. The Renormalization Group
  13. (Note: Sections suggested to be omitted in less formal courses on particle physics.)Critical Exponents and Scalar Field Theory
    Final Project: Coleman–Weinberg Potential
3. Non-Abelian Gauge Theories
  14. Invitation: The Parton Model of Hadron Structure
  15. Non-Abelian Gauge Invariance
  16. Quantization of Non-Abelian Gauge Theories
  17. Quantum Chromodynamics
  18. Operator Products and Effective Vertices
  19. Perturbation Theory Anomalies
  20. Gauge Theories with Spontaneous Symmetry Breaking
  21. Quantization of Spontaneously Broken Gauge Theories
    Final Project: Decays of the Higgs Boson
4. Epilogue
  22. Quantum Field Theory at the Frontier

== Reception ==
The textbook was well received when it was released and it has become a standard textbook in the field. Emil Martinec praised how theory was developed in order to connect with experiments. Martinec said that before the book, his students needed to consult many different sources. Michelangelo Mangano writing for the CERN Courier indicated that the third chapter could be a book by itself and was previously not available in textbook form.

Tom Banks praised Peskin and Schroeder's treatment of quantum electrodynamics (chapter 5) and Wilsonian renormalization. Banks only criticized that Feynman rules were derived twice in the book, and that it omitted topics in the non-perturbative treatment of quantum field theory like color confinement and chiral symmetry breaking.

Nima Arkani-Hamed considers the book by Peskin and Schroeder one of the two classics in the field, along with the 1964 Relativistic Quantum Mechanics by Sidney Drell and James Bjorken.

== See also ==
- Quantum Field Theory in a Nutshell by Anthony Zee
