= Spacetime and Geometry =

Graduate physics textbook by Sean M. Carroll

Spacetime and Geometry: An Introduction to General Relativity
- Author: Sean M. Carroll
- Language: English
- Subject: General relativity
- Genre: Non-fiction
- Publisher: Addison-Wesley; Cambridge University Press
- Publication date: 2003; 2019 (reprint)
- Publication place: United States of America
- Media type: Print
- Pages: xiv + 513
- ISBN: 978-1-108-48839-6 (reprint)
- Website: https://www.preposterousuniverse.com/spacetimeandgeometry/

Spacetime and Geometry: An Introduction to General Relativity is a textbook written by physicist Sean Michael Carroll for beginning graduate students in physics. The book was developed from the lecture notes for a graduate course on general relativity Carroll taught at the Massachusetts Institute of Technology. Compared to the lecture notes, still available online for free from Carroll's personal website, the book is newer and contains more worked examples.

Spacetime and Geometry occupies the middle ground between a rigorous mathematical presentation and a utilitarian approach. Like many other textbooks, it develops the necessary mathematical concepts in differential geometry—especially covariant differentiation and the curvature tensor—before exploring its main subject matter. It covers the standards topics in general relativity. But unlike other introductory texts, it includes a chapter on quantum field theory in flat as well as curved spacetime. Its discussion of cosmology, a rapidly growing field, is up-to-date for its time, with an account of inflation.

== Contents ==
- Preface
- Special Relativity and Flat Spacetime
- Manifolds
- Curvature
- Gravitation
- The Schwarzschild Solution
- More General Black Holes
- Perturbation Theory and Gravitational Radiation
- Cosmology
- Quantum Field Theory in Curved Spacetime
- Appendices

== Reception ==
Jennie Traschen praised the book for its correct yet accessible presentation of general relativity in a manner useful for graduate students who wish to undertake further study in either gravitational or high-energy physics, or both. She also had a high opinion of Carroll's illustrations.

Eric Poisson considered Spacetime and Geometry by Carroll to be one of the best textbooks on the subject published in the 2000s, suitable for an introductory graduate course on general relativity. He noted that Carroll's chapter on quantum field in curved spacetime was unique among introductory texts of the time. However, he disliked the book's "sketchy" presentation of the Reissner–Nordström and Kerr solutions to the Einstein field equations, its omission of cosmological perturbations and the anisotropies in the cosmic microwave background radiation.

Robert Wald described Spacetime and Geometry as "pedagogically oriented" graduate textbook in a paper on teaching general relativity.

Lawrence Ford opined that Spacetime and Geometry was roughly at the same level as General Relativity: An Introduction for Physicists (2006) by Michael Hobson, George Efstathiou, and Anthony Lasenby. But whereas the former offered a deeper discussion of the geometric aspects of gravitation and how it related to quantum field theory, the latter focused more on the cosmological implications of general relativity.

In their survey of some well-known textbooks on general relativity, Nelson Christensen and Thomas Moore put Spacetime and Geometry in the category of graduate-level books with a comparatively high level of mathematical sophistication, though less challenging than Gravitation and Cosmology (1972) by Steven Weinberg; Gravitation (1973) by Charles Misner, Kip Thorne, and John Archibald Wheeler; or General Relativity (1984) by Robert Wald. Like these other texts, Spacetime and Geometry motivated and developed the necessary mathematical concepts before going over the key physical implications of general relativity.

Olivier Sarbach considered the book to be suitable for students and scientists who wish to attain a deep understanding of general relativity, including its theoretical implications and mathematical formulation.

Daniel Finley strongly recommended the book after using it in his courses. He especially liked Carroll's explanations of manifolds, Lie derivatives, and Penrose diagrams.

== See also ==
- Gravitation (1973) by Charles Misner, Kip Thorne, and John Wheeler
- General Relativity (1984) by Robert Wald
- Einstein Gravity in a Nutshell (2013) by Anthony Zee
- List of books on general relativity
