= General Relativity (book) =

1984 graduate textbook by Robert M. Wald

- Hardcover edition
- Author: Robert Wald
- Cover artist: René Magritte
- Language: English
- Subject: General relativity
- Genre: Non-fiction
- Publisher: The University of Chicago Press
- Publication date: 1984
- Publication place: United States
- Media type: Print; EPUB and PDF in 2010
- Pages: xiii + 491
- ISBN: 0226870332
- OCLC: 10018614
- Dewey Decimal: 530.1/1 19
- LC Class: QC173.6 .W35 1984
- Website: Official website

General Relativity is a graduate textbook and reference written by the gravitational physicist Robert Wald. It provides a mathematically rigorous and thorough introduction to Albert Einstein's general theory of relativity.

== Overview ==
Published by the University of Chicago Press in 1984, the book of almost 500 pages covers many aspects of the theory of General Relativity. It is divided into two parts: Part I covers the fundamentals of the subject, and Part II covers more advanced topics such as causal structure, and quantum effects. The book uses the abstract index notation for tensors. It covers spinors, the variational-principle formulation, the initial-value formulation, (exact) gravitational waves, singularities, Penrose diagrams, Hawking radiation, and black-hole thermodynamics.

It is aimed at beginning graduate students and researchers. To this end, most of the material in Part I is geared towards an introductory course on the subject, while Part II covers a wide range of advanced topics for a second term or further study. The essential mathematical methods for the formulation of general relativity are presented in Chapters 2 and 3, while more advanced techniques are discussed in Appendices A to C. Wald believes that this is the best way forward because putting all the mathematical techniques at the beginning of the book would prove to be a major obstruction for students, while developing these mathematical tools as they get used would mean they are too scattered to be useful. While the Hamiltonian formalism is often presented in conjunction with the initial-value formulation, Wald covers these topics independently, with Hamiltonian relegated to the appendix, alongside the Lagrangian formalism.

This book uses the $(-,+,+,+)$ sign convention for reasons of technical convenience, with one important exception: in Chapter 13 only, the sign convention is switched to $(+,-,-,-)$ because it is considered easier to treat spinors this way, and this is the most common sign convention used in the literature.

Most of the book uses geometrized units, meaning the fundamental natural constants $G$ (Newton's gravitational constant) and $c$ (the speed of light in vacuum) are set equal to one, except when predictions that can be tested are made.

== Table of contents ==
- Part I: Fundamentals
  - Chapter 1: Introduction
  - Chapter 2: Manifolds and Tensor Fields
  - Chapter 3: Curvature
  - Chapter 4: Einstein's Equation
  - Chapter 5: Homogeneous, Isotropic Cosmology
  - Chapter 6: The Schwarzschild Solution
- Part II: Advanced Topics
  - Chapter 7: Methods for Solving Einstein's Equation
  - Chapter 8: Causal Structure
  - Chapter 9: Singularities
  - Chapter 10: Initial Value Formulation
  - Chapter 11: Asymptotic Flatness
  - Chapter 12: Black Holes
  - Chapter 13: Spinors
  - Chapter 14: Quantum Effects in Strong Gravitational Fields
- Appendices
  - A. Topological Spaces
  - B. Differential Forms, Integration, and Frobenius's Theorem
  - C. Maps of Manifolds, Lie Derivatives, and Killing Fields
  - D. Conformal Transformations
  - E. Lagrangian and Hamiltonian Formulations of Einstein's Equation
  - F. Units and Dimensions.
- References
- Index

== Assessment ==
Hans C. Ohanian, who taught and researched gravitation at the Rensselaer Polytechnic Institute, opined in 1985 that General Relativity provided a modern introduction to the subject with emphasis on tensor and topological methods and offers some "sharp insights." However, its quality is very variable. Topics such as geodetic motion in the Schwarzschild metric, the Krushkal extension, and energy extraction from black holes, are handled well, while empirical tests of Einstein's theory are barely touched; and the treatment of advanced topics, including cosmology, is just too brief to be useful to students. Due to its heavy use of higher mathematics, it may not be suitable for an introductory course.

Lee Smolin argued in 1986 that General Relativity bridges the gap between the presentation of the material in older textbooks and the literature. For example, while the early pioneers of the subject, including Einstein himself, employed coordinate-based methods, researchers since the mid-1960s had switched to coordinate-free formulations, on which Wald's text is entirely based. Its style is uniformly clear and economical, if too brief at times. Topics that deserve more attention include gravitational radiation and cosmology. However, this book could be supplemented by those by Misner, Thorne, and Wheeler, and by Weinberg. Smolin was teaching a course on general relativity to undergraduates as well as graduate students at Yale University using this book, and felt satisfied with the results. He also found it useful as a reference to refresh his memory.

Andrzej Trautman praised the book for skillfully applying tensor calculus and local differential geometry, and for containing materials not otherwise available in book form at the time of its publication. He further noted that Wald discussed further mathematical methods for relativity in the appendices, unlike other authors of the era.

Theoretical physicist James W. York commented in 1987 that General Relativity was a sophisticated yet concise book on the subject that should be appealing to the mathematically inclined, as a high level of rigor is maintained throughout the book. However, he considered the material on linearized gravity too short, and recommended Gravitation by Charles Misner, Kip Thorne, and John Archibald Wheeler, and Gravitation and Cosmology by Steven Weinberg as supplements.

In their Foreword to the Feynman Lectures on Gravitation, John Preskill and Kip Thorne recommended General Relativity by Wald as a pedagogically effective and modern introduction to the subject, with an emphasis on its geometric nature.

Nelson Christensen and Thomas Moore put General Relativity by Wald in the same category as Gravitation and Cosmology by Weinberg as well as Gravitation by Misner, Thorne, and Wheeler, noting that these are all mathematically sophisticated graduate-level texts on the subject.

In his 2018 review, Daniel Finley, a professor at the University of New Mexico, said this textbook was written by a person with good physical intuition. However, the author did not use the most modern mathematical methods available, and his treatment of cosmology had become outdated. Finley deemed the abstract index notation difficult to learn, though convenient for those who had mastered it.

== See also ==
- Gravitation (1973) by Charles Misner, John Wheeler, and Kip Thorne
- Spacetime and Geometry (2003) by Sean Michael Carroll
- Einstein Gravity in a Nutshell (2013) by Anthony Zee
- List of books on general relativity
