= Sign convention =

Agreed-upon meaning of a physical quantity being positive or negative

In physics, a sign convention is a choice of the physical significance of signs (plus or minus) for a set of quantities, in a case where the choice of sign is arbitrary. "Arbitrary" here means that the same physical system can be correctly described using different choices for the signs, as long as one set of definitions is used consistently. The choices made may differ between authors. Disagreement about sign conventions is a frequent source of confusion, frustration, misunderstandings, and even outright errors in scientific work. In general, a sign convention is a special case of a choice of coordinate system for the case of one dimension.

Sometimes, the term "sign convention" is used more broadly to include factors of the imaginary unit i and 2π, rather than just choices of sign.

== Relativity ==
=== Metric signature ===
In relativity, the metric signature can be either (+,−,−,−) or (−,+,+,+). (Throughout this article, the signs of the eigenvalues of the metric are displayed in the order that presents the timelike component first, followed by the spacelike components). A similar convention is used in higher-dimensional relativistic theories; that is, (+,−,−,−,...) or (−,+,+,+,...). A choice of signature is associated with a variety of names, physics discipline, and notable graduate-level textbooks:

Comparison of metric signatures in general relativity
Metric signature	(+,−,−,−)	(−,+,+,+)
Spacetime interval convention	timelike, $\tau^2 = x^\mu x_\mu$	spacelike, $\tau^2 = -x^\mu x_\mu$
Subject area primarily using convention	Particle physics and Relativity	Relativity
Corresponding metric tensor	$$\begin{pmatrix} 1 & 0 & 0 & 0 \\ 0 & -1 & 0 & 0 \\ 0 & 0 & -1 & 0 \\ 0 & 0 & 0 & -1 \end{pmatrix}$$	$$\begin{pmatrix} -1 & 0 & 0 & 0 \\ 0 & 1 & 0 & 0 \\ 0 & 0 & 1 & 0 \\ 0 & 0 & 0 & 1 \end{pmatrix}$$
Mass–four momentum relationship	$m^2 = p^{\mu}p_{\mu}$	$m^2 = -p^{\mu}p_{\mu}$
Common names of convention	West coast convention; "Mostly minuses"; Landau–Lifshitz sign convention	East coast convention; "Mostly pluses"; Pauli convention
Graduate textbooks using convention	Landau & Lifshitz; The Mathematical Theory of Black Holes (Subrahmanyan Chandrasekhar); Gravitation: an introduction to current research (L. Witten); Introducing Einstein's relativity (Ray D'Inverno); General relativity (Michael P. Hobson, George Efstathiou & Anthony N. Lasenby)	Gravitation (Charles Misner, Kip Thorne, and John A. Wheeler); Spacetime and Geometry: An Introduction to General Relativity (Sean M. Carroll); General Relativity (Robert Wald) (Wald changes signature to the timelike convention for Chapter 13 only)

=== Curvature ===
The Ricci tensor is defined as the contraction of the Riemann tensor. Some authors use the contraction $R_{ab} \, = R^c{}_{acb}$, whereas others use the alternative $R_{ab} \, = R^c{}_{abc}$. Due to the symmetries of the Riemann tensor, these two definitions differ by a minus sign.

In fact, the second definition of the Ricci tensor is $R_{ab} \, = {R_{acb}}^c$. The sign of the Ricci tensor does not change, because the two sign conventions concern the sign of the Riemann tensor. The second definition just compensates the sign, and it works together with the second definition of the Riemann tensor (see e.g. Barrett O'Neill's Semi-riemannian geometry).

== Other sign conventions ==
- The sign choice for time in frames of reference and proper time: + for future and − for past is universally accepted.
- The choice of $\pm$ in the Dirac equation.
- The sign of the electric charge, field strength tensor $\, F_{ab}$ in gauge theories and classical electrodynamics.
- Time dependence of a positive-frequency wave (see, e.g., the electromagnetic wave equation):
  - $\, e^{-i\omega t}$ (mainly used by physicists)
  - $\, e^{+j\omega t}$ (mainly used by engineers)
- The sign for the imaginary part of permittivity (in fact dictated by the choice of sign for time-dependence).
- The signs of distances and radii of curvature of optical surfaces in optics.
- The sign of work in the first law of thermodynamics.
- The sign of the weight of a tensor density, such as the weight of the determinant of the covariant metric tensor.
- The active and passive sign convention of current, voltage and power in electrical engineering.
- A sign convention used for curved mirrors assigns a positive focal length to concave mirrors and a negative focal length to convex mirrors.

It is often considered good form (since it reduces ambiguity and the risk of misunderstanding) to state explicitly which sign convention is to be used at the beginning of each book or article.

== See also ==
- Orientation (vector space)
- Symmetry (physics)
- Gauge theory
- Negative logic
