= Quantum Field Theory in a Nutshell =

Textbook by Anthony Zee

- Author: Anthony Zee
- Language: English
- Subject: Quantum field theory
- Genre: Non-fiction
- Publisher: Princeton University Press
- Publication date: 2003 (1st ed.); 2010 (2nd ed.)
- Publication place: United States
- Media type: Print
- Pages: 576 (2nd ed.)
- ISBN: 978-0-691-01019-9
- Website: https://www.kitp.ucsb.edu/zee/books/quantum-field-theory-nutshell

Quantum Field Theory in a Nutshell is a textbook by Anthony Zee, first published in 2003 by Princeton University Press. It has been adopted by professors at many universities, including Harvard University, Princeton University, the University of California, Berkeley, the California Institute of Technology, Columbia University, Stanford University, and Brown University, among others.

== Reception ==
Stephen Barr said of the book, "Like the famous Feynman Lectures on Physics, this book has the flavor of a good blackboard lecture." Michael Peskin wrote in Classical and Quantum Gravity, "This is quantum field theory taught at the knee of an eccentric uncle; one who loves the grandeur of his subject, has a keen eye for a slick argument, and is eager to share his repertoire of anecdotes about Feynman, Fermi, and all of his heroes [...] This [book] can help [students] love the subject and race to its frontier." David Tong called it a "charming book, where emphasis is placed on physical understanding and the author isn't afraid to hide the ugly truth when necessary. It contains many gems." According to Zvi Bern, "Zee has an infectious enthusiasm and a remarkable talent for slicing through technical mumbo jumbo to arrive at the heart of a problem." Jacques Distler judged it to be "written at the right level for undergraduates" but not sufficiently focused to function as an undergraduate text.

== See also ==
- Einstein Gravity in a Nutshell (2013) by the same author
- An Introduction to Quantum Field Theory (1995) by Michael Peskin and Daniel V. Schroeder
