= Taub–NUT space =

Exact solution to Einstein's equations

The Taub–NUT metric (/tɔːb nʌt/, /- ˌɛn.juːˈtiː/) is an exact solution to Einstein's equations. It may be considered a first attempt in finding the metric of a spinning black hole. It is sometimes also used in homogeneous but anisotropic cosmological models formulated in the framework of general relativity.

The underlying Taub space was found by Abraham Haskel Taub (1951), and extended to a larger manifold by Ezra T. Newman, Louis A. Tamburino, and Theodore W. J. Unti (1963), whose initials form the "NUT" of "Taub–NUT".

== Description ==
Taub's solution is an empty space solution of Einstein's equations with topology R×S^{3} and metric (or equivalently line element)

$$g =-dt^2/U(t) + 4l^2U(t)(d\psi+ \cos\theta d\phi)^2+(t^2+l^2)(d\theta^2+(\sin\theta)^2d\phi^2)$$

where

$$U(t)=\frac{2mt+l^2-t^2}{t^2+l^2}$$

and m and l are positive constants.

Taub's metric has coordinate singularities at $U=0, t=m+(m^2+l^2)^{1/2}$, and Newman, Tamburino and Unti showed how to extend the metric across these surfaces.

== Related work ==
=== Kerr metric ===
When Roy Kerr developed the Kerr metric for spinning black holes in 1963, he ended up with a four-parameter solution, one of which was the mass and another the angular momentum of the central body. One of the two other parameters was the NUT-parameter, which he threw out of his solution because he found it to be nonphysical since it caused the metric to be not asymptotically flat, while other sources interpret it either as a gravomagnetic monopole parameter of the central mass, or a twisting property of the surrounding spacetime.

=== Misner spacetime ===
A simplified 1+1-dimensional version of the Taub–NUT spacetime is the Misner spacetime.

== Notes ==
- Newman, E.; Tamburino, L.; Unti, T. (1963). "Empty-space generalization of the Schwarzschild metric". Journal of Mathematical Physics. 4 (7): 915–923. Bibcode:1963JMP.....4..915N. doi:10.1063/1.1704018. ISSN 0022-2488. MR 0152345.
- Taub, A. H. (1951). "Empty space-times admitting a three parameter group of motions". Annals of Mathematics. Second Series. 53 (3): 472–490. doi:10.2307/1969567. ISSN 0003-486X. JSTOR 1969567. MR 0041565.
