= Fermat's and energy variation principles in field theory =

Light motion in curved spacetime

In general relativity, light is assumed to propagate in a vacuum along a null geodesic in a pseudo-Riemannian manifold. Besides the geodesics principle in a classical field theory there exists Fermat's principle for stationary gravity fields.

== Fermat's principle ==
In case of conformally stationary spacetime with coordinates $(t,x^1,x^2,x^3)$ a Fermat metric takes the form
$$g = e^{2f(t,x)}[(dt+\phi_{\alpha}(x)dx^{\alpha})^{2}-\hat{g}_{\alpha\beta} dx^{\alpha} dx^{\beta}],$$
where the conformal factor $f(t,x)$ depends on time $t$ and space coordinates $x^{\alpha}$ and does not affect the lightlike geodesics apart from their parametrization.

Fermat's principle for a pseudo-Riemannian manifold states that the light ray path between points $x_a=(x^1_a,x^2_a,x^3_a)$ and $x_b = (x^1_b,x^2_b,x^3_b)$ corresponds to stationary action.
$$S=\int^{\mu_a}_{\mu_b}\left(\sqrt{\hat{g}_{\alpha\beta} \frac{dx^{\alpha}}{d\mu} \frac{dx^{\beta}}{d\mu}}+\phi_{\alpha}(x)\frac{dx^{\alpha}}{d\mu} \right) d\mu,$$
where $\mu$ is any parameter ranging over an interval $[\mu_a, \mu_b]$ and varying along curve with fixed endpoints $x_a=x(\mu_a)$ and $x_b=x(\mu_b)$.

== Principle of stationary integral of energy ==
In principle of stationary integral of energy for a light-like particle's motion, the pseudo-Riemannian metric with coefficients $\tilde{g}_{ij}$ is defined by a transformation
$$\tilde{g}_{00} =\rho ^{2}{g}_{00} ,\,\,\,\, \tilde{g}_{0k}=\rho{g}_{0k} ,\,\,\,\, \tilde{g}_{kq} ={g}_{kq} .$$

With time coordinate $x^0$ and space coordinates with indexes k,q=1,2,3 the line element is written in form
$$ds^2=\rho^2 g_{00}(dx^{0})^{2}+ 2\rho g_{0k}dx^{0}dx^{k}+g_{kq}dx^{k}dx^{q},$$
where $\rho$ is some quantity, which is assumed equal 1. Solving light-like interval equation $ds=0$ for $\rho$ under condition $g_{00} \ne 0$ gives two solutions
$$\rho =\frac{-g_{0k} v^{k} \pm \sqrt{(g_{0k} g_{0q} -g_{00} g_{kq})v^{k} v^{q} } }{g_{00} v^{0} },$$
where $v^i = dx^i/d\mu$ are elements of the four-velocity. Even if one solution, in accordance with making definitions, is $\rho=1$.

With $g_{00}=0$ and $g_{0k} \ne 0$ even if for one k the energy takes form
$$\rho =-\frac{g_{kq} v^{k} v^{q} }{2v_{0} v^{0}}.$$

In both cases for the free moving particle the Lagrangian is
$$L= -\rho.$$

Its partial derivatives give the canonical momenta
$$p_{\lambda}=\frac{\partial L}{\partial v^{\lambda}}=\frac{v_{\lambda}}{v^{0}v_{0}}$$
and the forces
$$F_{\lambda}=\frac{\partial L }{\partial x^{\lambda}}=\frac{1}{2v^{0}v_{0}}\frac{\partial g_{ij}}{\partial x^{\lambda}}v^{i}v^{j}.$$

Momenta satisfy energy condition for closed system
$$\rho=v^{\lambda}p_{\lambda}-L,$$
which means that $\rho$ is the energy of the system that combines the light-like particle and the gravitational field.

Standard variational procedure according to Hamilton's principle is applied to action
$$S=\int^{\mu_a}_{\mu_b}L d\mu=-\int^{\mu_a}_{\mu_b}\rho d\mu,$$
which is integral of energy. Stationary action is conditional upon zero variational derivatives δS/δx^{λ} and leads to Euler–Lagrange equations
$$\frac{d}{d\mu}\frac{\partial \rho }{\partial v^{\lambda}}-\frac{\partial \rho }{\partial x^{\lambda}}=0,$$
which is rewritten in form
$$\frac{d}{d\mu} p_{\lambda}-F_{\lambda}=0.$$

After substitution of canonical momentum and forces they yields motion equations of lightlike particle in a free space
$$\frac{dv^0}{d\mu}+\frac{v^0}{2v_0} \frac{\partial g_{ij}}{\partial x^0} v^i v^j = 0$$
and
$$(g_{k\lambda} v_0 - g_{0k} v_{\lambda}) \frac{dv^k}{d\mu}+\left[v_{0}\Gamma_{0ij}-v_{\lambda} \Gamma_{\lambda ij}\right] v^i v^j=0,$$
where $\Gamma_{kij}$ are the Christoffel symbols of the first kind and indexes $\lambda$ take values $1,2,3$. Energy integral variation and Fermat principles give identical curves for the light in stationary space-times.

== Generalized Fermat's principle ==
In the generalized Fermat's principle the time is used as a functional and together as a variable. It is applied Pontryagin's minimum principle of the optimal control theory and obtained an effective Hamiltonian for the light-like particle motion in a curved spacetime. It is shown that obtained curves are null geodesics.

The stationary energy integral for a light-like particle in gravity field and the generalized Fermat principles give identity velocities. The virtual displacements of coordinates retain path of the light-like particle to be null in the pseudo-Riemann space-time, i.e. not lead to the Lorentz-invariance violation in locality and corresponds to the variational principles of mechanics. The equivalence of the solutions produced by the generalized Fermat principle to the geodesics, means that the using the second also turns out geodesics. The stationary energy integral principle gives a system of equations that has one equation more. It makes possible to uniquely determine canonical momenta of the particle and forces acting on it in a given reference frame.

== Euler–Lagrange equations in contravariant form ==
The equations
$$\frac{d}{d\mu} p_{\lambda}-F_{\lambda}=0$$
can be transformed into a contravariant form
$$\frac{dp^{k} }{d\mu }+g^{k\lambda } \frac{\partial g_{\lambda i} }{\partial x^{j} } v^{j} p^{i} =F^{k},$$
where the second term in the left part is the change in the energy and momentum transmitted to the gravitational field
$$\frac{d\stackrel{\leftrightarrow}{p^{k}} }{d\mu }=g^{k\lambda } \frac{\partial g_{\lambda  i} }{\partial x^{j} } v^{j} p^{i}$$
when the particle moves in it. The force vector ifor principle of stationary integral of energy is written in form
$$F^k = g^{k\lambda}\frac{1}{2v^{0}v_{0}}\frac{\partial g_{ij}}{\partial x^{\lambda}}v^{i}v^{j}.$$
In general relativity, the energy and momentum of a particle is ordinarily associated with a contravariant energy-momentum vector $p^{k}$. The quantities $F^k$do not form a tensor. However, for the photon in Newtonian limit of Schwarzschild field described by metric in isotropic coordinates they correspond to its passive gravitational mass equal to twice rest mass of the massive particle of equivalent energy. This is consistent with Tolman, Ehrenfest and Podolsky result for the active gravitational mass of the photon in case of interaction between directed flow of radiation and a massive particle that was obtained by solving the Einstein-Maxwell equations.

After replacing the affine parameter
$$d\acute{\mu}=v_0v^0d\mu$$
the expression for the momenta turned out to be
$$p^{\lambda}=\acute{v}^{\lambda},$$
where 4-velocity is defined as $\acute{v}^{\lambda}=dx^{\lambda}/d\acute{\mu}$. Equations with contravariant momenta
$$\frac{dp^{k} }{d\mu }+g^{k\lambda } \frac{\partial g_{\lambda i} }{\partial x^{j} } v^{j} p^{i} = g^{k\lambda}\frac{1}{2v^{0}v_{0}}\frac{\partial g_{ij}}{\partial x^{\lambda}}v^{i}v^{j}$$
are rewritten as follows
$$\frac{dp^{k} }{d\acute{\mu} }+g^{k\lambda } \frac{\partial g_{\lambda i} }{\partial x^{j} } \acute{v}^{j} p^{i} = g^{k\lambda}\frac{1}{2}\frac{\partial g_{ij}}{\partial x^{\lambda}}\acute{v}^{i}\acute{v}^{j}.$$
These equations are identical in form to the ones obtained from the Euler-Lagrange equations with Lagrangian $L=\frac{1}{2}g_{ij}\frac{dx_i}{ds}\frac{dx_j}{ds}$ by raising the indices. In turn, these equations are identical to the geodesic equations, which confirms that the solutions given by the principle of stationary integral of energy are geodesic. The quantities
$$\frac{d\stackrel{\leftrightarrow}{p^{k}} }{d\acute{\mu}}=g^{k\lambda } \frac{\partial g_{\lambda i} }{\partial x^{j} } \acute{v}^{j} p^{i}$$
and
$$\acute{F}^k = g^{k\lambda}\frac{1}{2}\frac{\partial g_{ij}}{\partial x^{\lambda}}\acute{v}^{i}\acute{v}^{j}$$
appear as tensors for linearized metrics.

== See also ==
- Fermat's principle
- Variational methods in general relativity
