= Boris Podolsky =

American physicist (1896–1966)

- Борис Подольский
- Born: Boris Yakovlevich Podolsky; June 29, 1896; Taganrog, Don Host Oblast, Russian Empire
- Died: November 28, 1966 (aged 70); Cincinnati, Ohio, U.S.
- Education: California Institute of Technology; University of Southern California
- Known for: EPR paradox
- Scientific career
- Fields: Physics
- Workplaces: University of Cincinnati; Leipzig University; Kharkiv Polytechnic Institute; California Institute of Technology; Institute for Advanced Study; Xavier University, Cincinnati; Los Angeles Bureau of Power and Light
- Doctoral advisor: Paul Sophus Epstein

Boris Yakovlevich Podolsky (Russian: Борис Яковлевич Подольский; June 29, 1896 – November 28, 1966) was a Russian-American physicist of Jewish descent, noted for his work with Albert Einstein and Nathan Rosen on entangled wave functions and the EPR paradox.

== Education ==
In 1896, Boris Podolsky was born into a poor Jewish family in Taganrog, in the Don Host Oblast of the Russian Empire and attended the Taganrog Gymnasium. He moved to the United States in 1913. After receiving a Bachelor of Science degree in electrical engineering from the University of Southern California in 1918, he served in the US Army and then worked at the Los Angeles Bureau of Power and Light. In 1926, he obtained an MS in mathematics from the University of Southern California. In 1928, he received a PhD in theoretical physics (under Paul Sophus Epstein) from Caltech.

== Career ==
Under a National Research Council Fellowship, Podolsky spent a year at the University of California, Berkeley, followed by a year at Leipzig University. In 1930, he returned to Caltech, working with Richard C. Tolman for one year. He then went to the Ukrainian Institute of Physics and Technology (Kharkiv, USSR), collaborating with Vladimir Fock, Paul Dirac (who was there on a visit), and Lev Landau. In 1932 he published a seminal early paper on quantum electrodynamics with Dirac and Fock, In 1933, he returned to the US with a fellowship from the Institute for Advanced Study, Princeton.

In a letter dated November 10, 1933, to Abraham Flexner, founding director of the Institute for Advanced Study at Princeton, Einstein described Podolsky as "one of the most brilliant of the younger men who has worked and published with [Paul] Dirac". In 1935, Einstein and others at the Institute wrote letters of recommendation for Podolsky, addressed to Louis T. More, Dean of the Graduate School of the University of Cincinnati, in which Einstein wrote: "I am happy to be able to tell you that I estimate Podolsky's abilities very highly ... he is an independent investigator of unquestionable talent." In 1935, Podolsky took a post as professor of mathematical physics at the University of Cincinnati. At the University of Cincinnati he was MS adviser to Chihiro Kikuchi, and PhD adviser to Herman Branson and Alex Green. In 1961, he moved to Xavier University, Cincinnati, where he worked until his death in 1966.

== Work ==
Working with Albert Einstein and Nathan Rosen, Podolsky conceived the EPR paradox. This famous paper stimulated debate as to the interpretation of quantum mechanics, culminating with Bell's theorem and the advent of quantum information theory.

In 1933, Podolsky and Lev Landau had the idea to write a textbook on electromagnetism beginning with special relativity and emphasizing theoretical postulates rather than experimental laws. This project did not come to fruition due to Podolsky's return to the United States, where he had immigrated in 1913. However, in the hands of Lev Landau and E. Lifshitz, the outline they produced became The Classical Theory of Fields (1951). On the same basis, Podolsky and K. Kunz produced Fundamentals of Electrodynamics, Marcel Dekker Press (1969), to which Podolsky's son, Robert, contributed most of the questions at the end of each chapter.

== Possible contact with Soviet spies during World War II ==
A 2009 book by John Earl Haynes, Harvey Klehr and Alexander Vassiliev, Spies: The Rise and Fall of the KGB in America, identifies Podolsky as a contact (QUANTUM) who met twice with Soviet secret services in 1942 and 1943. The evidence for these contacts is somewhat indirect. Early during World War II, several Venona cables identify a contact named QUANTUM who sought out Soviet intelligence in 1942 and asked for a position in the USSR to work on processing uranium-235. A 1943 Venona cable shows that QUANTUM provided relatively simple equations known as Graham's law of gaseous diffusion (known since 1848) which can be used to separate fissile U-235 from unwanted U-238. QUANTUM was paid $300 for this information according to a Venona cable. The Soviets never contacted him again because they felt that QUANTUM was unreliable. A former KGB officer named Alexander Vassiliev took notes from the KGB archive after the fall of the USSR which suggested that QUANTUM was Podolsky.

== In popular culture ==
Podolsky is played by the actor Gene Saks in the 1994 Hollywood film I.Q.

== See also ==
- Fermat's and energy variation principles in field theory
- Molecular Hamiltonian
- Rigid rotor

== Other sources ==
=== Primary source materials ===
- Conference on the Foundations of Quantum Mechanics, 1962. University Archives, Xavier University.
- Niels Bohr Scientific Correspondence, Supplement, 1910–1962. Niels Bohr Archive.
