= Misner space =

Abstract mathematical spacetime

Misner space is an abstract mathematical spacetime, first described by Charles W. Misner. It is also known as the Lorentzian orbifold $\mathbb{R}^{1,1}/\text{boost}$. It is a simplified, two-dimensional version of the Taub–NUT spacetime. It contains a non-curvature singularity and is an important counterexample to various hypotheses in general relativity.

Michio Kaku develops the following analogy for understanding the concept: "Misner space is an idealized space in which a room, for example, becomes the entire universe. For example, every point on the left wall of the room is identical to the corresponding point on the right wall, such that if you were to walk toward the left wall you will walk through the wall and appear from the right wall. This suggests that the left and right wall are joined, in some sense, as in a cylinder. The opposite walls are thus all identified with each other, and the ceiling is likewise identified with the floor. Misner space is often studied because it has the same topology as a wormhole but is much simpler to handle mathematically. If the walls move, then time travel might be possible within the Misner universe."

== Metric ==
The simplest description of Misner space is to consider two-dimensional Minkowski space with the metric

$$ds^2= -dt^2 + dx^2,$$

with the identification of every pair of spacetime points by a constant boost

$$(t, x) \to (t \cosh (\pi) + x \sinh(\pi), x \cosh (\pi) + t \sinh(\pi)).$$

It can also be defined directly on the cylinder manifold $\mathbb{R} \times S$ with coordinates $(t', \varphi)$ by the metric

$$ds^2= -2dt'd\varphi + t'd\varphi^2,$$

The two coordinates are related by the map

$$t= 2 \sqrt{-t'} \cosh\left(\frac{\varphi}{2}\right)$$

$$x= 2 \sqrt{-t'} \sinh\left(\frac{\varphi}{2}\right)$$

and

$$t'= \frac{1}{4}(x^2 - t^2)$$
$$\phi= 2 \tanh^{-1}\left(\frac{x}{t}\right)$$

== Causality ==
Misner space is a standard example for the study of causality since it contains both closed timelike curves and a compactly generated Cauchy horizon, while still being flat (since it is just Minkowski space). With the coordinates $(t', \varphi)$, the loop defined by $t = 0, \varphi = \lambda$, with tangent vector $X = (0,1)$, has the norm $g(X,X) = 0$, making it a closed null curve. This is the chronology horizon : there are no closed timelike curves in the region $t < 0$, while every point admits a closed timelike curve through it in the region $t > 0$.

This is due to the tipping of the light cones which, for $t < 0$, remains above lines of constant $t$ but will open beyond that line for $t > 0$, causing any loop of constant $t$ to be a closed timelike curve.

== Chronology protection ==
Misner space was the first spacetime where the notion of chronology protection was used for quantum fields, by showing that in the semiclassical approximation, the expectation value of the stress-energy tensor for the vacuum $\langle T_{\mu\nu} \rangle_\Omega$ is divergent.
