= Richard A. Isaacson =

American physicist (born 1941)

Richard Allen Isaacson
- Born: October 6, 1941 (age 84)
- Education: University of Maryland, College Park
- Known for: Shepherding the LIGO project to fruition
- Scientific career
- Doctoral advisor: Charles W. Misner

Richard Allen Isaacson (born October 6, 1941) is a retired American physicist who has been cited by 2017 Nobel Laureate Rainer Weiss as indispensable to the LIGO gravitational wave project. Isaacson's 1967 PhD dissertation established that the theoretical gravitational waves had features similar to other known types of waves. Isaacson went on to champion the LIGO project as the NSF Program Director of Gravitational Physics for decades. Weiss and fellow Laureate Kip Thorne have honored Isaacson by endowing the American Physical Society's Richard A. Isaacson Award in Gravitational-Wave Science
