= Emil Martinec =

American theoretical physicist

Emil John Martinec (born 1958) is an American string theorist, a physics professor at the Enrico Fermi Institute at the University of Chicago, and director of the Kadanoff Center for Theoretical Physics. He was part of a group at Princeton University that developed heterotic string theory in 1985.

== Early life and education ==
Martinec was born October 4, 1958, in Downers Grove, Illinois. He graduated from Northwestern University in 1979 and earned his Ph.D. from Cornell University in 1984, with a dissertation titled, Quantum Mechanics Versus General Covariance In Gravity And String Models, advised by Michael Peskin. He worked the last two years of his graduate education at SLAC, following Peskin's move there.

== Career ==
Early in his career, Martinec worked at Princeton University, where he was part of a research group known as the "Princeton string quartet" that also included physicists David Gross, Jeffrey A. Harvey and Ryan Rohm. The group developed heterotic string theory in 1985. As its name suggests, heterotic string theory combines elements of multiple versions of string theory to attempt to create a more realistic explanation of elementary particle physics. This work was part of a series of advances that forestalled the predicted merger of cosmology and fundamental physics.

He is currently a professor at the Enrico Fermi Institute at the University of Chicago. He directs the university's Kadanoff Center for Theoretical Physics.

== Selected publications ==
Martinec is co-author of six papers that SLAC's inSPIRE database classifies as "renowned" (having 500 or more citations apiece):

- Dixon, L.; Friedan, D.; Martinec, E.; Shenker, S. (1987). "The conformal field theory of orbifolds". Nuclear Physics B. 282: 13–73. Bibcode:1987NuPhB.282...13D. doi:10.1016/0550-3213(87)90676-6.
- Friedan, D.; Martinec, E.; Shenker, S. (1986). "Conformal invariance, supersymmetry and string theory". Nuclear Physics B. 271 (1): 93. doi:10.1016/0550-3213(86)90356-1.
  - Republished as Friedan, D.; Martinec, E.; Shenker, S. (1986). "Conformal invariance, supersymmetry and string theory". Nuclear Physics B. 271 (3–4): 93. Bibcode:1986NuPhB.271...93F. doi:10.1016/S0550-3213(86)80006-2.
- Callan, C. G.; Friedan, D.; Martinec, E. J.; Perry, M. J. (1985). "Strings in background fields". Nuclear Physics B. 262 (4): 593. Bibcode:1985NuPhB.262..593C. doi:10.1016/0550-3213(85)90506-1.
- Gross, D. J.; Harvey, J. A.; Martinec, E.; Rohm, R. (1986). "Heterotic string theory". Nuclear Physics B. 267 (1): 75–124. Bibcode:1986NuPhB.267...75G. doi:10.1016/0550-3213(86)90146-X.
- Gross, D. J.; Harvey, J. A.; Martinec, E.; Rohm, R. (1985). "Heterotic string theory (I). The free heterotic string". Nuclear Physics B. 256: 253–284. Bibcode:1985NuPhB.256..253G. doi:10.1016/0550-3213(85)90394-3.
- Gross, D. J.; Harvey, J. A.; Martinec, E.; Rohm, R. (1985). "Heterotic String". Physical Review Letters. 54 (6): 502–505. Bibcode:1985PhRvL..54..502G. doi:10.1103/PhysRevLett.54.502. PMID 10031535.

== Awards ==
- Alfred P. Sloan Foundation Fellow (Year: 1987, Field: Physics)
- National Science Foundation Presidential Young Investigator
- U.S. Department of Energy Outstanding Junior Investigator
