= Gravitation (book) =

Textbook by Misner, Thorne, and Wheeler

- Authors: Charles W. Misner; Kip Thorne; John Archibald Wheeler
- Cover artist: Kenneth Gwin
- Language: English
- Subject: General relativity
- Genre: Non-fiction
- Publisher: W. H. Freeman; Princeton University Press
- Publication date: 1973, 2017
- Publication place: United States
- Media type: Print
- Pages: li + 1279
- ISBN: 0-7167-0344-0
- OCLC: 585119
- Dewey Decimal: 531/.14
- LC Class: QC178 .M57
- Website: https://press.princeton.edu/books/hardcover/9780691177793/gravitation

Gravitation is a textbook on Albert Einstein's general theory of relativity, written by Charles W. Misner, Kip S. Thorne, and John Archibald Wheeler. It was originally published by W. H. Freeman and Company in 1973 and reprinted by Princeton University Press in 2017. It is frequently abbreviated MTW (for its authors' last names). The cover illustration, drawn by Kenneth Gwin, is a line drawing of an apple with cuts in the skin to show the geodesics on its surface.

The book contains 10 parts and 44 chapters, each beginning with a quotation. The bibliography has a long list of original sources and other notable books in the field. While this may not be considered the best introductory text because its coverage may overwhelm a newcomer, and even though parts of it are now out of date, it has remained a highly valued reference for advanced graduate students and researchers as of 1998.

== Content ==
=== Subject matter ===
After a brief review of special relativity and flat spacetime, physics in curved spacetime is introduced and many aspects of general relativity are covered; particularly about the Einstein field equations and their implications, experimental confirmations, and alternatives to general relativity. Segments of history are included to summarize the ideas leading up to Einstein's theory. The book concludes by questioning the nature of spacetime and suggesting possible frontiers of research. Although the exposition on linearized gravity is detailed, one topic which is not covered is gravitoelectromagnetism. Some quantum mechanics is mentioned, but quantum field theory in curved spacetime and quantum gravity are not included.

The topics covered are broadly divided into two "tracks", the first contains the core topics while the second has more advanced content. The first track can be read independently of the second track. The main text is supplemented by boxes containing extra information, which can be omitted without loss of continuity. Margin notes are also inserted to annotate the main text.

The mathematics, primarily tensor calculus and differential forms in curved spacetime, is developed as required. An introductory chapter on spinors near the end is also given. There are numerous illustrations of advanced mathematical ideas such as alternating multilinear forms, parallel transport, and the orientation of the hypercube in spacetime. Mathematical exercises and physical problems are included for the reader to practice.

The prose in the book is conversational; the authors use plain language and analogies to everyday objects. For example, Lorentz transformed coordinates are described as a "squashed egg-crate" with an illustration. Tensors are described as "machines with slots" to insert vectors or one-forms, and containing "gears and wheels that guarantee the output" of other tensors.

=== Sign and unit conventions ===
MTW uses the − + + + sign convention, and discourages the use of the + + + + metric with an imaginary time coordinate $ict$. In the front endpapers, the sign conventions for the Einstein field equations are established and the conventions used by many other authors are listed.

The book also uses geometrized units, in which the gravitational constant $G$ and speed of light $c$ are each set to 1. The back end papers contain a table of unit conversions.

== Editions and translations ==
- Misner, Charles W.; Thorne, Kip S.; Wheeler, John Archibald (1973), Gravitation, San Francisco: W. H. Freeman, ISBN 978-0-7167-0344-0. The book has been reprinted in English numerous times, both in paperback and hardcover.
- Misner, Charles W.; Thorne, Kip S.; Wheeler, John Archibald (2017). Gravitation. Princeton University Press. ISBN 9780691177793. Reprint with a new preface by David Kaiser.

It has also been translated into other languages, including Russian (in three volumes), Chinese, and Japanese.

== Reviews ==
The book is still considered influential in the physics community, with generally positive reviews, but with some criticism of the book's length and presentation style. To quote Ed Ehrlich:

'Gravitation' is such a prominent book on relativity that the initials of its authors MTW can be used by other books on relativity without explanation.

James Hartle notes in his book:

Over thirty years since its publication, Gravitation is still the most comprehensive treatise on general relativity. An authoritative and complete discussion of almost any topic in the subject can be found within its 1300 pages. It also contains an extensive bibliography with references to original sources. Written by three twentieth-century masters of the subject, it set the style for many later texts on the subject, including this one.

Sean M. Carroll states in his own introductory text:

The book that educated at least two generations of researchers in gravitational physics. Comprehensive and encyclopedic, the book is written in an often-idiosyncratic way that you will either like or not.

Pankaj Sharan writes:

This large sized (20cm × 25cm), 1272 page book begins at the very beginning and has everything on gravity (up to 1973). There are hundreds of diagrams and special boxes for additional explanations, exercises, historical and bibliographical asides and bibliographical details.

Ray D'Inverno suggests:

I would also recommend looking at the relevant sections of the text of Misner, Thorne, and Wheeler, known for short as ‘MTW’. MTW is a rich resource and is certainly worth consulting for a whole string of topics. However, its style is not perhaps for everyone (I find it somewhat verbose in places and would not recommend it for a first course in general relativity). MTW has a very extensive bibliography.

Many texts on general relativity refer to it in their bibliographies or footnotes. In addition to the four given, other modern references include George Efstathiou et al., Bernard F. Schutz, James Foster et al., Robert Wald, and Stephen Hawking et al.

Other prominent physics books also cite it. For example, Classical Mechanics (second edition) by Herbert Goldstein, who comments:

This massive treatise (1279 pages! (the pun is irresistible)) is to be praised for the great efforts made to help the reader through the maze. The pedagogic apparatus includes separately marked tracks, boxes of various kinds, marginal comments, and cleverly designed diagrams.

The third edition of Goldstein's text still lists Gravitation as an "excellent" resource on field theory in its selected biography.

A 2019 review of another work by Gerard F. Gilmore opened: "Every teacher of General Relativity depends heavily on two texts: one, the massive ‘Gravitation’ by Misner, Thorne and Wheeler, the second the diminutive ‘The Meaning of Relativity’ by Einstein."

== See also ==
- General Relativity by Robert Wald
- The Large Scale Structure of Space-Time by Stephen Hawking and George Ellis
- Einstein Gravity in a Nutshell by Anthony Zee
- List of books on general relativity
