= Anthony Zee =

Chinese-American physicist (b. 1945)

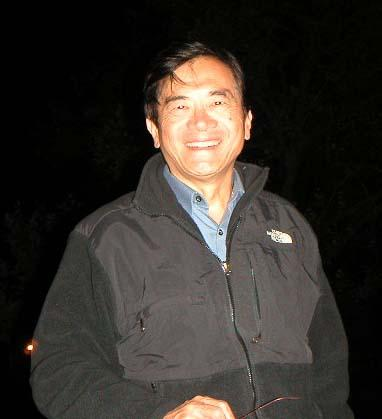
- Born: 7 June 1945 (age 81); Kunming, Republic of China
- Education: Princeton University (B.A. 1966); Harvard University (Ph.D. 1970)
- Known for: Darkon; Quantum Field Theory in a Nutshell (2003); Einstein Gravity in a Nutshell (2013)
- Awards: Sloan Research Fellowship; Humboldt Research Award; Harvard Radcliffe Institute Fellowship; Fellow of the American Academy of Arts and Sciences; Fellow of the American Physical Society
- Scientific career
- Institutions: Institute for Advanced Study; University of Pennsylvania; University of Washington; University of California, Santa Barbara
- Doctoral advisor: Sidney Coleman
- Doctoral students: Stephen Barr; David Wolpert

Anthony Zee
- Traditional Chinese: 徐一鴻
Transcriptions
Standard Mandarin
- Hanyu Pinyin: Xú Yīhóng

Anthony Zee (Chinese: 徐一鴻, born 7 June 1945) (Zee comes from /ʑi^{23}/, the Shanghainese pronunciation of 徐) is a Chinese-American physicist, writer, and a professor at the Kavli Institute for Theoretical Physics and the physics department of the University of California, Santa Barbara. His popular publications include Fearful Symmetry: The Search for Beauty in Modern Physics and An Old Man's Toy: Gravity at Work and Play in Einstein's Universe. His textbooks include Quantum Field Theory in a Nutshell, Einstein Gravity in a Nutshell, and Group Theory in a Nutshell for Physicists. He is also the author of Swallowing Clouds: A Plafyul Journey Through Chinese Language, Culture and Cuisine.

== Early life and education ==
Zee was born in Kunming, China, in 1945, but his family fled to Hong Kong when he was four years old. His father was a self-taught businessman, and after a few years in Hong Kong, during a slump in business, decided to move the family again, this time to Brazil. The family settled in São Paulo, where Zee attended an American international high school before emigrating to the US in 1962 to attend Princeton University, where he worked with the physicist John Archibald Wheeler. After graduating from Princeton, Zee obtained his PhD from Harvard University, where he focused on the use of group theory in physics, supervised by Sidney Coleman. He graduated in 1970 and went on to complete a postdoc at the Institute for Advanced Study in Princeton, New Jersey. He would later return to the institute in 1977 and 1978 during a sabbatical year while on faculty at Princeton.

== Career ==
After completing his postdoctoral studies, Zee accepted an assistant professorship at Rockefeller University in New York in 1972. He only stayed a year before returning to Princeton as an assistant professor in 1973. In his first year back at Princeton, Zee had Ed Witten as his teaching assistant and grader. In 1978 Zee moved on to the University of Pennsylvania for two years. From there he went to the University of Washington before settling at the Kavli Institute for Theoretical Physics at the University of California, Santa Barbara, in 1985. At UCSB, Zee teaches courses on both general relativity and quantum field theory. The culmination of his teaching is his highly regarded and widely praised "trilogy" of graduate level textbooks: Quantum Field Theory in a Nutshell, Einstein Gravity in a Nutshell, and Group Theory in a Nutshell for Physicists. He is also the author of several books for general readers about physics and Chinese culture.

== Research ==
Zee specializes in theoretical physics; research interests include high energy physics, field theory, cosmology, biophysics, condensed matter physics, and mathematical physics. He has authored or co-authored more than 200 scientific publications and several books on particle physics, condensed matter physics, anomalies in physics, random matrix theory, superconductivity, the quantum Hall effect, and other topics in theoretical physics and evolutionary biology, as well as their various interrelations.

=== Evolutionary biology ===
In winter 2001, Johns Hopkins University Press published an article by Zee titled "On Fat Deposits around the Mammary Glands in the Females of Homo Sapiens" in the New Literary History. Zee described the female breasts and reproductive system from the perspective of evolutionary psychology. He wrote, "The reproductive value of a woman at a given time is her fertility integrated from that time until the end of her reproductive life. While fertility typically peaks in the mid-twenties, reproductive value peaks in the teens." and "Like the mammary glands in the male, the female orgasm does not appear to serve any useful biological function. In most primates, female orgasm is either absent or inconspicuous." (See also mate value.) This article was published after Ralph Louis Cohen invited Zee to write an article of his choice in the literary magazine.

== Books ==
Technical:

- 1982. Unity of Forces in the Universe. Singapore: World Scientific.
- 2010. Quantum Field Theory in a Nutshell. 2nd ed. Princeton University Press. ISBN 978-0691140346
- 2013. Einstein Gravity in a Nutshell. Princeton University Press. ISBN 978-0691145587
- 2016. Group Theory in a Nutshell for Physicists. Princeton University Press. ISBN 978-0691162690
- 2020. Fly by Night Physics: How Physicists Use the Backs of Envelopes. Princeton University Press. 2020. ISBN 978-0-691-18254-4.

General readers:

- 1989. An Old Man's Toy, Oxford University Press. ISBN 978-0-02-633440-2
- 1990. Swallowing Clouds, University of Washington Press. ISBN 978-0-671-74724-4
- 2007. Fearful Symmetry: The Search for Beauty in Modern Physics, 2nd ed. Princeton University Press. Foreword by Roger Penrose. ISBN 978-0-691-00946-9. 1986 1st ed. published by Macmillan; 2016 paperback edition published by Princeton University Press ISBN 978-0-691-17326-9
- 2018. On Gravity: A Brief Tour of a Weighty Subject. Princeton University Press. 2018. ISBN 978-0-691-17438-9.
- 2023. Quantum Field Theory As Simply As Possible. Princeton University Press. 2023. ISBN 978-0-691-17429-7.
- 2025. Top Ten Ideas of Physics: Foundations for Understanding the Universe. Princeton University Press. 2025. ISBN 978-0-691-22580-7

== Awards and honors ==
- Institute for Advanced Study Dyson Distinguished Visiting Professor
- Alfred P. Sloan Research Fellowship – 1973
- Harvard Radcliffe Fellowship – 2006-2007
- Alexander Von Humboldt Foundation Humboldt Research Award – 2011
- Fellow of the American Academy of Arts and Sciences – 2014
- Fellow of American Physical Society (APS) - 2014
