= Michael Peskin =

American theoretical physicist (born 1951)

- Born: October 27, 1951 (age 75); Philadelphia, Pennsylvania, United States
- Education: Harvard University; Cornell University (PhD)
- Known for: Peskin–Takeuchi parameter An Introduction to Quantum Field Theory (1995)
- Scientific career
- Fields: Particle physics
- Workplaces: SLAC National Accelerator Laboratory
- Doctoral advisor: Kenneth G. Wilson
- Doctoral students: Matt Strassler

Michael Edward Peskin (born October 27, 1951, Philadelphia) is an American theoretical physicist. He is currently a professor in the theory group at the SLAC National Accelerator Laboratory.

Peskin has been recognized for his work in proposing and analyzing unifying models of elementary particles and forces in theoretical elementary particle physics, and proposing experimental methods for testing such models. His textbook, An Introduction to Quantum Field Theory (1995), co-authored with Daniel Schroeder, is widely used in graduate physics courses. Peskin–Takeuchi parameters are named after him.

== Education ==
Michael Peskin is a fourth generation descendant of Jewish-Lithuanian emigrants from the Pale of Settlement. Both of his parents became medical doctors. Peskin attended Lower Merion High School in the Philadelphia area and later New Trier West in the Chicago suburbs.

Peskin was an undergraduate at Harvard University. He obtained his Ph.D. in 1978 from Cornell University under the supervision of Kenneth Wilson. He was a junior fellow at the Harvard Society of Fellows from 1977–1980.

== Career ==
After receiving his Ph.D. from Cornell University, Peskin served as a junior fellow of the Harvard Society of Fellows from 1977 to 1980. He also held postdoctoral appointments at Saclay Nuclear Research Centre (1979–1980) and Cornell (1980–1982). In 1982, Peskin joined the faculty of the SLAC National Accelerator Laboratory at Stanford University.

In 2000, Peskin was elected to the American Academy of Arts and Sciences. He was appointed a co-editor of the journal Annual Review of Nuclear and Particle Science as of 2023. He also serves on the Board of Directors of Annual Reviews.

== Research ==
Peskin has worked on many aspects of quantum field theory and elementary particle physics, exploring and going beyond the Standard Model of particle physics to explore technicolor theories. Peskin and Daniel V. Schroeder's widely used textbook on quantum field theory, An Introduction to Quantum Field Theory (1995, 2018) is considered a classic in the field. More recently, he has written Concepts of Elementary Particle Physics (2019), a textbook on the Standard Model.

In 1990, Peskin and Tatsu Takeuchi proposed the parameterization of a set of three measurable quantities, called S, T, and U, that are used to describe and simplify precision electroweak fits. These parameters are sensitive to new physics which contributes to oblique corrections. They are now called the Peskin–Takeuchi parameters.

Peskin uses high energy colliders to search for new physical interactions on the basis of high-precision observations and measurements of elementary particles, including the W and Z bosons, the top quark, and the Higgs boson. He is interested in modelling dark matter and is an advocate of building a future linear collider, a "factory" for the Higgs boson.

== Selected publications ==
- Peskin, Michael Edward; Schroeder, Daniel V. (1995). An Introduction to Quantum Field Theory. Reading: Addison-Wesley. Published by CRC Press, 2018.
- Peskin, M. E. (1 May 1997). Beyond the Standard Model. SLAC National Accelerator Lab., Menlo Park, CA (United States).
- Peskin, Michael (13 June 2018). Model-Independent Determination of the Triple Higgs Coupling at e e- Colliders. SLAC National Accelerator Lab., Menlo Park, CA (United States). OSTI 1443894.
- Peskin, Michael Edward (2019). Concepts of elementary particle physics. Oxford New York: Oxford university press. ISBN 978-0-19-881218-0.
