= Charles W. Misner =

American physicist (1932–2023)

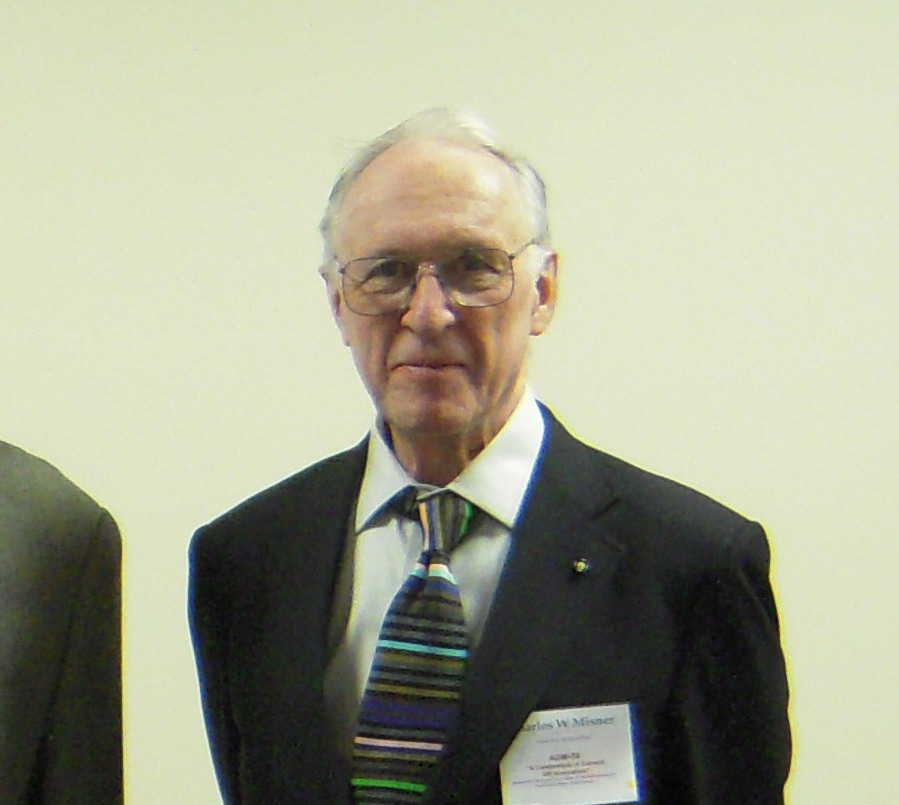
- Born: June 13, 1932; Jackson, Michigan, U.S.
- Died: July 24, 2023 (aged 91)
- Education: University of Notre Dame; Princeton University
- Known for: Gravitation; Mixmaster universe Misner space ADM formalism Wormhole
- Awards: Guggenheim Fellowship; Heineman Prize (1994); Albert Einstein Medal
- Scientific career
- Fields: General relativity
- Workplaces: Princeton University; University of Maryland
- Thesis: Outline of Feynman Quantization of General Relativity; Derivation of Field Equations; Vanishing of the Hamiltonian (1957)
- Doctoral advisor: John Wheeler; Arnold Ross
- Doctoral students: Carl H. Brans; Richard A. Isaacson; James A. Isenberg; Richard Matzner; Vincent Moncrief; C. V. Vishveshwara

Signature
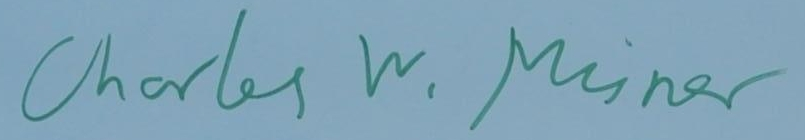

Charles William Misner (/ˈmɪznər/; June 13, 1932 – July 24, 2023) was an American physicist and one of the authors of Gravitation. His specialties included general relativity and cosmology. His work has also provided early foundations for studies of quantum gravity and numerical relativity.

== Biography ==
=== Academic training and university positions ===
Misner received his B.S. degree from the University of Notre Dame in 1952. He then moved to Princeton University, where he earned an M.A. in 1954 and completed his Ph.D. in 1957. His dissertation, Outline of Feynman Quantization of General Relativity; Derivation of Field Equations; Vanishing of the Hamiltonian, was completed under John Wheeler.

Prior to completing his Ph.D., Misner joined the faculty of the Princeton Physics Department with the rank of Instructor (1956–1959), and was subsequently promoted to assistant professor (1959–1963). In 1963 he moved to the University of Maryland, College Park as an associate professor and achieved full professor status there in 1966. Since 2000, Misner has been Professor Emeritus of Physics, and he continued to be a member of the Gravitation Theory Group in the Maryland Center for Fundamental Physics. During his career, Misner advised 22 Ph.D. students primarily at Princeton and at the University of Maryland.

Misner held visiting positions at the Max Planck Institute for Gravitational Physics (also known as the Albert Einstein Institute); the Kavli Institute for Theoretical Physics at the University of California, Santa Barbara; the Pontifical Academy of Cracow (Poland); the Institute for Physical Problems in Moscow (during the time of the Soviet Union); the California Institute of Technology, the University of Oxford, and the University of Cambridge.

=== Research ===
Most of Misner's research fell into the area of general relativity, which describes the gravitational interactions of very massive bodies. He contributed to the early understanding of cosmology - he was one of the first to point out the horizon problem, the role of topology in general relativity, quantum gravity, and numerical relativity. In the areas of cosmology and topology he first studied the mixmaster universe, which he devised in an attempt to better understand the dynamics of the early universe, and developed a solution to the Einstein field equation that is now known as Misner space. Together with Richard Arnowitt and Stanley Deser he published a Hamiltonian formulation of the Einstein equation that split Einstein's unified spacetime back into separated space and time. This set of equations, known as the ADM formalism, plays a role in some attempts to unify quantum mechanics with general relativity. It is also the mathematical starting-point for most techniques for numerically solving Einstein's equations.

In 2015, the Albert Einstein Society presented the Albert Einstein Medal to Deser and Misner for their work; Arnowitt had died the previous year.

=== Death ===
Charles W. Misner died on July 24, 2023, at the age of 91.

== Bibliography ==
- Misner, Charles W.; Kip S. Thorne; John Archibald Wheeler (September 1973). Gravitation. San Francisco: W. H. Freeman. ISBN 0-7167-0344-0.
- Misner, Charles W.; Patrick A. Cooney (1991). Spreadsheet Physics. Reading, MA: Addison-Wesley. ISBN 0-201-16410-8.
- Misner, Charles W.; Putnam, Peter (November 15, 1959). "Active Gravitational Mass". Physical Review. 116 (4): 1045–1046. doi:10.1103/PhysRev.116.1045. ISSN 0031-899X.
