= Robert Wald =

American gravitational physicist (b. 1947)

Robert M. Wald
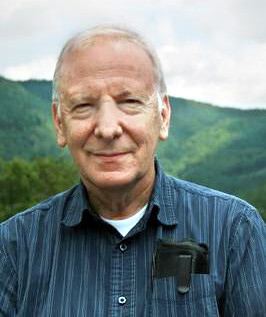
- Wald in 2012
- Born: June 29, 1947 (age 79)
- Citizenship: United States
- Education: Columbia University (A.B. 1968); Princeton University (PhD 1972)
- Known for: General Relativity (1984); Wald's formula for black-hole entropy
- Father: Abraham Wald
- Awards: Member of the National Academy of Sciences (2001); Einstein Prize (APS) (2017); Albert Einstein Medal (2025); Dirac Medal (ICTP) (2025)
- Scientific career
- Fields: Gravitational physics
- Workplaces: University of Maryland, College Park; University of Chicago
- Thesis: Nonspherical gravitational collapse and black hole uniqueness (1972)
- Doctoral advisor: John Archibald Wheeler

Robert M. Wald (/wɔːld/; born June 29, 1947, in New York City) is an American theoretical physicist and professor at the University of Chicago. He studies general relativity, black holes, and quantum gravity and has written textbooks on these subjects.

== Life and education ==
He is the son of the mathematician and statistician Abraham Wald and great-grandson of the chief rabbi Moshe Shmuel Glasner. Wald's parents died in a plane crash when he was three years old. He earned his bachelor's degree from Columbia University in 1968 and his PhD in physics from Princeton University in 1972, under the supervision of John Archibald Wheeler. His doctoral dissertation was titled Nonspherical Gravitational Collapse and Black Hole Uniqueness.

== Career and contributions ==
Between 1972 and 1974, Robert Wald worked as a research associate in physics at the University of Maryland. He then moved to the University of Chicago, spending two years as a postdoctoral fellow before joining the faculty in 1976. He wanted to move to Chicago in order to work with Robert Geroch and other specialists in gravitation.

In 1977, Wald published a popular-science book titled Space, Time, and Gravity: The Theory of the Big Bang and Black Holes explaining Albert Einstein's general theory of relativity, and its implications in cosmology and astrophysics. The book also gives a survey of what was then ongoing research on gravitational collapse and black holes. This book grew out of a series of lectures Wald gave as part of the Compton Lectures at the University of Chicago in the spring of 1976. The Compton Lectures, given every Spring and Fall quarter, are intended to explain notable advances in the physical sciences to members of the general public.

He published the textbook General Relativity in 1984. Aimed at beginning graduate students, it covers spinors, the variational principles, the initial-value formulation, (exact) gravitational waves, singularities, Penrose diagrams, Hawking radiation, and black-hole thermodynamics. It is well-received, but has become outdated by the early twenty-first century.

Wald has taught first-year graduate courses covering a broad range of topics, including classical mechanics, quantum mechanics, statistical mechanics, and electromagnetism. He has also taught courses on general relativity, his specialty, at both introductory and advanced levels. A particularly effective teacher, he received the Graduate Teaching Award from the University of Chicago in 1997.

Wald investigates black holes and their thermodynamics, and gravitational radiation-reaction (or self-force). During the early 1970s, Wald and a number of other theoretical physicists studied the external electric field lines of black holes, and subsequently the perturbations of black holes, following the publication of the Teukolsky equations by Saul Teukolsky in 1972. Wald has published over 100 research papers on general relativity and quantum field theory in curved spacetime, many of which have been cited by hundreds of subsequent papers. In 1993, he described the Wald entropy of a black hole, which is dependent simply on the area of the event horizon of the black hole.

He organized The Symposium on Black Holes and Relativistic Stars in 1996, in honor of the late Nobel Prize-winning theoretical astrophysicist Subrahmanyan Chandrasekhar. Distinguished speakers of this event included Stephen Hawking, Roger Penrose and Martin Rees. Although the event charged an entrance fee of $100, Wald made sure all University of Chicago students were admitted free of charge. Chandrasekhar founded a research group on general relativity at the University of Chicago, which includes Wald, James Hartle and Robert Geroch. Although Wald and Chandrasekhar never collaborated on any particular research projects, the two developed warm relations.

He became a fellow of the American Physical Society (APS) in 1996 and a member of the National Academy of Sciences in 2001. He received the Einstein Prize from the APS Division of Gravitational Physics in 2017 for "the discovery of the general formula for black hole entropy, and for developing a rigorous formulation of quantum field theory in curved spacetime."

Wald delivered a public lecture at the University of Alabama on October 27, 2015, titled "The Formulation of General Relativity," celebrating the centennial of Einstein's theory. Wald is a member of the LIGO group at the University of Chicago, headed by astrophysicist Daniel Holz. The Laser Interferometry Gravitational-wave Observatory detected gravitational waves for the first time in 2015, one century after Einstein predicted their existence.

In 2025 he received the Albert Einstein Medal from the Albert Einstein Society in Switzerland for his studies of classical and semi-classical gravity. In the same year, Wald, Gary Gibbons, Gary Horowitz, and Roy Kerr were awarded the Dirac Medal from the International Center for Theoretical Physics in Italy for their landmark contributions to the study of gravity, in both the classical and quantum regimes.

== Books ==
- Wald, Robert M. (1992) [1977]. Space, Time, and Gravity: The Theory of the Big Bang and Black Holes (2nd ed.). Chicago: University of Chicago Press. ISBN 0-226-87029-4.
- Wald, Robert M. (1984). General Relativity. Chicago: University of Chicago Press. ISBN 0-226-87033-2.
- Wald, Robert M. (1994). Quantum Field Theory in Curved Spacetime and Black Hole Thermodynamics. Chicago Lectures in Physics. Chicago: The University of Chicago Press. ISBN 0-226-87027-8.
- Wald, Robert M., ed. (1998). Black Holes and Relativistic Stars. Chicago: University of Chicago Press. ISBN 0-226-87035-9.
- Wald, Robert M. (2022). Advanced Classical Electromagnetism. Princeton: Princeton University Press. ISBN 978-0-691-22039-0.

== See also ==
- List of contributors to general relativity
- List of books on general relativity
- Bekenstein–Hawking entropy
