= List of cosmologists =

This is a list of people who have made noteworthy contributions to cosmology (the study of the history and large-scale structure of the universe) and their cosmological achievements.

== A ==
- Tom Abel (1970–) studied primordial star formation
- Roberto Abraham (1965–) studied the shapes of early galaxies
- Andreas Albrecht studied the formation of the early universe, cosmic structure, and dark energy
- Hannes Alfvén (1908–1995) theorized that galactic magnetic fields could be generated by plasma currents
- Ralph A. Alpher (1921–2007) argued that observed proportions of hydrogen and helium in the universe could be explained by the big bang model, predicted cosmic background radiation
- Aristarchus of Samos (310–230 BC) early proponent of heliocentrism
- Aristotle (circa 384–322 BC) posited a geocentric cosmology that was widely accepted for many centuries
- Aryabhata (476–550) described a geocentric model with slow and fast epicycles

== B ==
- Ja'far ibn Muhammad Abu Ma'shar al-Balkhi (787–886) conveyed Aristotle's theories from Persia to Europe
- James M. Bardeen (1939–2022) studied the mathematics of black holes and of vacua under general relativity
- John D. Barrow (1952–2020) popularized the anthropic cosmological principle
- Charles L. Bennett (1956–) studied the large-scale structure of the universe by mapping irregularities in microwave background radiation
- Orfeu Bertolami (1959–) studied the cosmological constant, cosmic inflation, dark energy–dark matter unification and interaction, alternative gravity theories
- Somnath Bharadwaj (1964–) studied large-scale structure formation
- James Binney (1950–) studied galactic dynamics and supernova disruption of galactic gasses
- Martin Bojowald (1973–) studied loop quantum gravity and established loop quantum cosmology
- Hermann Bondi (1919–2005) developed the steady-state model
- Mustapha Ishak Boushaki (1967–) physicist researcher on cosmology
- Tycho Brahe (1546–1601) promoted a geo-heliocentric system of epicycles
- Robert Brandenberger (1956–) formulated the theory of string gas cosmology, with colleague Cumrun Vafa, and developed cosmological perturbation theory

== C ==
- Bernard J. Carr (1949–) promoted the anthropic principle, studied primordial black holes
- Sean M. Carroll (1966–) researched dark energy, general relativity, and spontaneous cosmic inflation
- Gennady V. Chibisov (1946–2008) origin of cosmological density perturbations from quantum fluctuations
- Peter Coles (1963–) modeled galactic clustering and authored several cosmology books
- C. B. Collins used the anthropic principle to solve the flatness problem
- Asantha Cooray (1973–) studied dark energy, halo models of large structure, and cosmic microwave radiation
- Nicolaus Copernicus (1473–1543) formulated a heliocentric cosmology

== D ==
- Paul Davies (1946–) developed a vacuum model that explains microwave background fluctuation, studies time's arrow, and has written many popular-press books
- Marc Davis (1947–) was lead astronomer of a survey of 50,000 high-redshift galaxies
- Avishai Dekel (1951–) studied galaxy formation and large scale structure of the cosmos in dark matter-dark energy dominated universes
- Robert H. Dicke (1916–1997) measured background radiation, used an early version of the anthropic principle to relate the gravitational constant to the age of the universe
- Mike J. Disney (1937–) discovered low surface brightness galaxies

== E ==
- George Efstathiou (1955–) pioneering computer simulations, observations of galaxy clustering and studies of the fluctuations in the cosmic microwave background
- Jürgen Ehlers (1929–2008) described gravitational lensing and studied the mathematical implications of an isotropic microwave background
- Jaan Einasto (1929–) studied structure in the large-scale distribution of superclusters of galaxies, early proponent of dark matter
- Albert Einstein (1879–1955) introduced general relativity and the cosmological constant
- George F. R. Ellis (1939–) theorized a cylindrical steady-state universe with a naked singularity as recycling mechanism
- Richard S. Ellis (1950–) used gravitational lensing and high-redshift supernovae to study the origin of galaxies, large scale structure, and dark matter
- Encieh Erfani (1982–), studies inflation and the birth of primordial black holes

== F ==
- Sandra M. Faber (1944–) discovered the Great Attractor, a supercluster-scale gravitational anomaly; co-inventor of the theory of cold dark matter
- Hume A. Feldman (1953–) studies cosmological perturbations and the statistical and dynamical properties of the large scale structure of the universe
- Pedro G. Ferreira (1968–) his main interests are in general relativity and theoretical cosmology
- Carlos S. Frenk (1951–) studied cosmic structure formation
- Alexander Friedmann (1888–1925) discovered the expanding-universe solution to general relativity

== G ==
- George Gamow (1904–1968) argued that observed proportions of hydrogen and helium in the universe could be explained by the big bang model, modeled the mass and radius of primordial galaxies
- Margaret J. Geller (1947–) discovered the Great Wall, a superstructure-scale filament of galaxies
- Thomas Gold (1920–2004) proposed the steady-state theory
- Gerson Goldhaber (1924–2010) used supernova observations to measure the energy density of the universe
- J. Richard Gott (1947–) proposed the use of cosmic strings for time travel
- Alan Guth (1947–) explained the isotropy of the universe by theorizing a phase of exponential cosmic inflation soon after the big bang

== H ==
- Stephen W. Hawking (1942–2018) described singularities in general relativity and developed singularity-free models of the big bang; predicted primordial black holes
- Charles W. Hellaby described models of general relativity with nonconstant metric signature
- Michał Heller (1936–) researched noncommutative approaches to quantum gravity
- Robert C. Herman (1914–1997) predicted the background radiation temperature
- Lars Hernquist (1954–) studied galaxy formation and evolution
- Chris Hirata (1982–) researched weak gravitational lensing
- Honorius Augustodunensis (c.1080−1151) wrote a popular encyclopedia of cosmology, geography, and world history
- Hanns Hörbiger (1860–1931) formulated a pseudoscientific theory of ice as the basic substance of all cosmic processes
- Fred Hoyle (1915–2001) promoted the steady state theory, used the anthropic principle to explain the energy levels of carbon nuclei
- Edwin P. Hubble (1889–1953) demonstrated the existence of other galaxies and confirmed the relation between redshift and distance
- John P. Huchra (1948–2010) discovered the Great Wall, a superstructure-scale filament of galaxies

== I ==
- Mustapha Ishak Boushaki (1967–) physicist researcher on Cosmology
- Jamal Nazrul Islam (1939–2013) published seven books on Cosmology

== K ==
- Ronald Kantowski (1939–) discovered spatially homogeneous but anisotropic solutions to general relativity
- Johannes Kepler (1571–1630) pioneered heliocentrism, discovered elliptical planetary motion, attempted to explain heavenly motions through physical causes
- Isaak Markovich Khalatnikov (1919–2021) conjectured an oscillatory model with an essential singularity for the evolution of the universe
- Tom W. B. Kibble (1932–2016) introduced the concept of cosmic strings
- Robert Kirshner (1949–) discovered the Boötes void, a large region sparsely populated with galaxies, and wrote a popular book on cosmology
- Edward Kolb (1951–) studied big bang cosmology including the emergence of baryons and dark matter, and wrote a popular textbook on cosmology
- Lawrence M. Krauss (1954–) author of popular science books on cosmology including A Universe from Nothing

== L ==
- Ofer Lahav (1959–) studied dark matter and dark energy
- Tod R. Lauer (1957–) catalogued massive black holes at galaxy centers and correlated their mass with other properties of the galaxies' structures
- Georges Henri Lemaître (1894–1966) proposed the big bang theory and the distance-redshift relation
- Janna Levin (1967–) seeks evidence for a bounded universe of nontrivial topology
- Andrew R. Liddle (1965–) studied inflationary models, wrote two books on inflation and primordial inhomogeneities
- Evgeny M. Lifshitz (1915–1985) conjectured an oscillatory model with an essential singularity for the evolution of the universe
- Andrei Linde (1948–) pioneered cosmic inflationary models and proposed eternal chaotic inflation of universes from the false vacuum
- Abraham (Avi) Loeb (1962–) researched primordial stars, primordial black holes, quasars, reionization, gravitational lensing, and gamma-ray bursts
- Jean-Pierre Luminet (1951–) studied black holes and the topology of the Universe
- David H. Lyth (1940–) studied particle cosmology, wrote two books on cosmic inflation and primordial inhomogeneities

== M ==
- João Magueijo (1967–) proposed much faster speeds of light in the young universe as an alternative explanation to cosmic inflation for its homogeneity
- Richard Massey (1977–) mapped dark matter in the universe
- Charles W. Misner (1932–2023) studied solutions to general relativity including the mixmaster universe and Misner space, wrote influential text on gravitation
- John Moffat (1932–) proposed much faster speeds of light in the young universe, developed antisymmetric theories of gravity
- Lauro Moscardini (1961–) modeled galaxy clustering in the early universe

== N ==
- Jayant Narlikar (1938–2025) promoted steady state theories
- Isaac Newton (1642–1727) formulated the law of universal gravitation and supported the heliocentric model

== P ==
- György Paál (1934–1992) in the late 1950s studied the quasar and galaxy cluster distributions, in 1970 from redshift quantization came up with the idea that the Universe might have nontrivial topological structure
- Thanu Padmanabhan (1957–2021) studied quantum gravity and quantum cosmology
- Leonard Parker (1938–) established the study of quantum field theory within general relativity
- P. James E. Peebles (1935–) predicted cosmic background radiation, contributed to structure theory, developed models that avoid dark matter
- Roger Penrose (1931–) linked singularities to gravitational collapse, conjectured the nonexistence of naked singularities, and used gravitational entropy to explain homogeneity
- Arno Penzias (1933–2024) was the first to observe the cosmic background radiation
- Saul Perlmutter (1959–) used supernova observations to measure the expansion of the universe
- Mark M. Phillips (1951–) used supernova observations to discover acceleration in the expansion of the universe, calibrated the supernova distance scale
- Joel Primack (1945–2025) co-invented the theory of cold dark matter
- Ptolemy (90–168) wrote the only surviving ancient text on astronomy, conjectured a model of the universe as a set of nested spheres with epicycles

== Q ==
- Ali Qushji (1403–1474) challenged Aristotelian physics, in particular presenting empirical evidence against a stationary Earth, and may have influenced Copernicus

== R ==
- Lisa Randall (1962–) contributed to Randall–Sundrum models, which describe the world in terms of a warped geometry higher-dimensional universe
- Martin Rees (1942–) proposed that quasars are powered by black holes, disproved steady state by studying distribution of quasars
- Yoel Rephaeli used the distortion of the cosmic background by high-energy electrons to infer the existence of galaxy clusters
- Adam Riess (1969–) found evidence in supernova data that the expansion of the universe is accelerating and confirming dark energy models
- Wolfgang Rindler (1924–2019) coined the phrase "event horizon", Rindler coordinates, and popularized the use of spinors (with Roger Penrose)
- Howard P. Robertson (1903–1961) solved the two-body problem in an approximation to general relativity, developed the standard model of general relativity
- Vera Rubin (1928–2016) discovered discrepancies in galactic rotation rates leading to the theory of dark matter

== S ==
- Rainer K. Sachs (1932–2024) discovered gravitationally induced redshifts in the cosmic background radiation
- Carl Sagan (1934–1996) American astrophysicist, cosmologist and author
- Andrei Sakharov (1921–1989) invented the theory of twins, CPT-symmetric universes
- Allan Sandage (1936–2010) set the cosmological distance scale and accurately estimated the speed of expansion of the universe
- Brian P. Schmidt (1967–) used supernova data to measure the acceleration in the expansion of the universe
- David N. Schramm (1945–1997) was an expert on big bang theory and an early proponent of dark matter
- Dennis W. Sciama (1926–1999) studied many aspects of cosmology and supervised many other leading cosmologists
- Irving Segal (1918–1998) created chronometric cosmology with alternative explanation of redshift in spectra of distant sources
- Seleucus of Seleucia (c.190–c.150 BC) used tidal observations to support a heliocentric model
- Roman Ulrich Sexl (1939–1986) developed an ether-based theory of absolute simultaneity that is mathematically equivalent to special relativity
- Al-Sijzi (c. 945–1020) invented an astrolabe based on the Earth's rotation
- Joseph Silk (1942–) explained the homogeneity of the early universe using photon diffusion damping
- Willem de Sitter (1872–1934) developed a theory of dark matter with Einstein, found an expanding matterless solution to general relativity
- Vesto Slipher (1875–1969) performed the first measurements of radial velocities for galaxies, providing the empirical basis for the expansion of the universe
- Lee Smolin (1955–) studied quantum gravity, popularized a theory of cosmological natural selection
- George F. Smoot (1945–2025) used Cosmic Background Explorer satellite to measure the temperature and anisotropy of the early universe
- David N. Spergel (1961–) used Wilkinson Microwave Anisotropy Probe satellite to measure the temperature and anisotropy of the early universe
- Paul Steinhardt (1952–) pioneered inflationary cosmology, introduced first example of eternal inflation, introduced quintessential dark energy, introduced the concept of strongly self-interacting dark matter, studied brane cosmology and cyclic models of the universe
- Abd al-Rahman al-Sufi (903–986) wrote the Book of Fixed Stars, which lists over forty constellations and the stars within them
- Nicholas B. Suntzeff (1952–) used supernova observations to discover acceleration in the expansion of the universe, calibrated the supernova distance scale
- Rashid Sunyaev (1943–) developed a theory of density fluctuations in the early universe, described how to use cosmic background distortion to observe large-scale density fluctuations
- Alex Szalay (1949–) was working on structure formation in a neutrino-dominated universe, biased galaxy formation in a cold dark matter dominated universe and computing the power spectrum in hot, cold and warm dark matter dominated universes

== T ==
- Max Tegmark (1967–) determined the parameters of the lambda-cold dark matter model using Sloan Survey data, studied mathematical models of multiverses
- Trinh Xuan Thuan (1948–) researched galaxy formation and evolution
- William G. Tifft theorized that galactic redshifts are quantized
- Beatrice Tinsley (1941–1981) researched galactic evolution, the creation of lightweight elements, and accelerated expansion of the universe
- Frank J. Tipler (1947–) proved that time travel requires singularities, promoted the anthropic principle
- Richard C. Tolman (1881–1948) showed that the cosmic background keeps a black-body profile as the universe expands
- Mark Trodden (1968–) studied cosmological implications of topological defects in field theories
- Michael S. Turner (1949–) coined the term dark energy
- Neil Turok (1958–) predicted correlations between polarization and temperature anisotropy in the cosmic background, explained the big bang as a brane collision
- Henry Tye (1947–) proposed brane-antibrane interactions as a cause of cosmic inflation

== V ==
- Alexander Vilenkin (1949–) showed that eternal inflation is generic, studied cosmic strings, theorized the creation of the universe from quantum fluctuations

== W ==
- Robert M. Wald (1947–) wrote a popular textbook on general relativity, studied the thermodynamics of black holes and created an axiomatic formulation of quantum field theory in curved spacetime
- Arthur Geoffrey Walker (1909–2001) developed the standard model of general relativity and studied the mathematics of relativistic reference frames
- David Wands studied inflation, superstrings, and density perturbations in the early universe
- Yun Wang (1964–) uses supernova and galactic redshift data to probe dark energy
- Jeffrey Weeks (1956–) used cosmic background patterns to determine the topology of the universe
- Simon D. White (1951–) studied galaxy formation in the lambda-cold dark matter model
- David Todd Wilkinson (1935–2002) used satellite probes to measure the cosmic background radiation
- Edward L. Wright (1947–) promoted big bang theories, studied the effect of dust absorption on measurements of the cosmic background radiation

== Z ==
- Yakov Borisovich Zel'dovich (1914–1987) used accretion disks of massive black holes to explain quasars, predicted Compton scattering of the cosmic background radiation
- Fritz Zwicky (1898–1974) along with Walter Baade (1893–1960) coined the term "supernova", contributions in understanding neutron stars, supernovae as standard candles, gravitational lensing, and dark matter.

== See also ==
- Timeline of cosmological theories
