= Index of physics articles (Y) =

The index of physics articles is split into multiple pages due to its size.

To navigate by individual letter use the table of contents below.

== Y ==
- Y(4140)
- Y-Δ transform
- Y. P. Varshni
- Yablonovite
- Yadin Dudai
- Yahya El Mashad
- Yakir Aharonov
- Yakov Borisovich Zel'dovich
- Yakov Frenkel
- Yakov Lvovich Alpert
- Yamakawa Kenjirō
- Yang Fujia
- Yang–Baxter equation
- Yang–Mills existence and mass gap
- Yang–Mills theory
- Yang–Mills–Higgs equations
- Yarkovsky effect
- Yash Pal
- Yasha Rosenfeld
- Yasushi Takahashi
- Yaw-rate sensor
- Yaw drive
- Yb:LuVO4
- Yehia El-Mashad
- Yehuda (Leo) Levi
- Yellowcake
- Yerevan Physics Institute
- Yevgeny Adamov
- Yevgeny Konstantinovich Fyodorov
- Yevgeny Zababakhin
- Yevgeny Zavoisky
- Yield curve (physics)
- Yield surface
- Yilmaz theory of gravitation
- Yoel Rephaeli
- Yoichiro Nambu
- Yoji Totsuka
- Yoseph Bar-Cohen
- Yoseph Imry
- Yoshiaki Arata
- Yoshiki Kuramoto
- Yoshio Nishina
- Young's interference experiment
- Young's modulus
- Young Medal and Prize
- Young stellar object
- Young–Laplace equation
- Yousef Sobouti
- Yrast
- Yttrium aluminium garnet
- Yttrium barium copper oxide
- Yttrium lithium fluoride
- Yttrium orthovanadate
- Yu Min (physicist)
- Yuen-Ron Shen
- Yukawa interaction
- Yukawa potential
- Yulii Borisovich Khariton
- Yun Wang
- Yuri Golfand
- Yuri Nikolaevich Denisyuk
- Yuri Orlov
- Yuri Osipyan
- Yuri Trutnev (scientist)
- Yurii Shirokov
- Yuriy Rumer
- Yuval Ne'eman
- Yves Fortier (geologist)
- Yves Rocard
- Yvonne Choquet-Bruhat
