= David Bacon =

David Bacon may refer to:

- David Bacon (actor) (1914–1943), American film actor
- David Bacon (cosmologist), British cosmologist and director of the Institute of Cosmology and Gravitation, Portsmouth
- David Bacon (missionary) (1771–1817), American missionary and explorer who founded Tallmadge, Ohio
- David Bacon (photojournalist) (born 1948), American photojournalist and author
- David F. Bacon (born 1963), American computer scientist
- David Francis Bacon (1813–1865), American physician and author
- David William Bacon (1813–1874), bishop of Portland, Maine
