= Lutetium vanadate =

Names
- Other names Lutetium vanadate(IV); Lutetium divanadate Lutetium pyrovanadate

Identifiers
CAS Number	60571-03-1
3D model (JSmol)	Interactive image
- InChI: InChI=1S/2Lu.7O.2V/q2*+3;;6*-1;; Key: MUHIQNGSKIUBKJ-UHFFFAOYSA-N
- SMILES: [Lu+3].[Lu+3].[O-][V]([O-])([O-])O[V]([O-])([O-])[O-]

Properties
Chemical formula	Lu_{2}V_{2}O_{7}
Molar mass	563.818
- Except where otherwise noted, data are given for materials in their standard state (at 25 °C [77 °F], 100 kPa). Infobox references

Lutetium vanadate is inorganic compound with ferromagnetic and semiconducting properties, with the chemical formula of Lu_{2}V_{2}O_{7} with the same structure as pyrochlore.

== Preparation ==
Lutetium vanadate can be obtained by the reaction between lutetium oxide, vanadium trioxide and vanadium pentoxide at a high temperature (1400 °C) in an argon atmosphere with oxygen pressure of 2.0×10^{−5} bar.

2 Lu_{2}O_{3} + V_{2}O_{3} + V_{2}O_{5} → 2 Lu_{2}V_{2}O_{7}

== See also ==
- Ytterbium-doped lutetium orthovanadate
