= Bortolami =

Bortolami is an Italian surname. Notable people with the surname include:

- Gianluca Bortolami (born 1968), Italian road cyclist
- Marco Bortolami (born 1980), Italian rugby union player

== See also ==
- Bertolami
