= Asantha =

Asantha is a given name. Notable people with the name include:

- Asantha Basnayake (born 1987), Sri Lankan cricketer
- Asantha Cooray (fl. 1997), Sri Lankan academic
- Asantha Singappuli (born 1991), Sri Lankan cricketer

== See also ==
- Ashantha de Mel (born 1959), Sri Lankan cricketer
