= Ann Savage (astronomer) =

British astronomer (1946–2017)

Ann Savage FRAS
- Born: Ann Coleman; 15 May 1946; Canterbury, Kent, England
- Died: 9 January 2017 (aged 70); Coonabarabran, New South Wales, Australia
- Education: Brighton College of Technology; University of Sussex
- Spouse: Richard Savage (m. 1969)
- Children: 2
- Scientific career
- Fields: Astronomy
- Workplaces: Nautical Almanac Office; Parkes Observatory; Royal Observatory, Edinburgh; Anglo-Australian Observatory
- Thesis: The Surface Density of Quasars (1978)
- Doctoral advisor: John Gatenby Bolton

Ann Savage FRAS (née Coleman; 15 May 1946 – 9 January 2017) was a British astronomer.

== Biography ==
Savage was born 15 May 1946 in Canterbury, Kent, England. She attended the Whitstable and Seasalter Endowed School and Faversham Grammar School.

After school she worked as a scientific assistant at the Nautical Almanac Office in Herstmonceux, Sussex, part of the Royal Greenwich Observatory. In 1966 she began studying applied physics part-time at Brighton College of Technology. In 1969 she married Richard Savage. After graduating with a first-class honours degree in 1970 she studied towards an MSc at the astronomy department of the University of Sussex, graduating in 1972.

Savage began DPhil studies at Sussex on quasars, initially working with Margaret Burbidge. In 1974 she relocated to the Parkes Observatory in New South Wales, Australia, working with John Bolton carrying out a photographic survey of the southern celestial hemisphere. She was awarded her DPhil in 1978 with a thesis on the surface density of quasars.

From 1979 to 1982 she was part of the UK Schmidt Telescope (UKST) team based in Coonabarabran, New South Wales. From 1982 to 1986 she was based at the Royal Observatory in Edinburgh, Scotland, before returning to Coonabrabran. From 1987 to 1993 she was the astronomer-in-charge of the UKST, contributing to the transfer of the operations of the telescope from the Royal Observatory, Edinburgh to the Anglo-Australian Observatory.

Savage retired early in 1995 due to poor health. In 2012 Savage was diagnosed with cancer and died 9 January 2017 in Coonabrabran at the age of 70.
