= Institute of Cosmology and Gravitation, University of Portsmouth =

English research institute

- Affiliations: Faculty of Technology, University of Portsmouth
- Head of Department: Professor David Bacon
- Location: Portsmouth, United Kingdom
- Website: www.port.ac.uk/research/institute-of-cosmology-and-gravitation

The Institute of Cosmology and Gravitation is a research institute at the University of Portsmouth devoted to topics in cosmology, galaxy evolution and gravitation. It has nearly 50 staff, post-docs and students working on subjects from inflation in the early Universe to understanding the stellar populations in galaxies.

Research at the Institute is supported by grants from STFC (the UK Science and Technology Facilities Council), the Royal Society and the European Union.

== History ==
The Institute of Cosmology and Gravitation, or ICG, was established as an independent research department by the University of Portsmouth in January 2002. It was formed from members of the Relativity and Cosmology Group that had been set up by Prof David Matravers, head of the School of Mathematical Studies at the University of Portsmouth, following the arrival of Roy Maartens as a lecturer in 1994. David Wands joined the group as a research fellow in 1996.

The group won their first major research grant from PPARC (the UK Particle Physics and Astronomy Research Council) in 1998 to study the evolution of cosmological structure. In the UK Research Assessment Exercise in 2001 (RAE2001) research submitted by the group was awarded a grade 5, recognising the international excellence of their work in applied mathematics, and leading to the establishment of the ICG the next year. Bob Nichol joined the ICG from Carnegie Mellon University (Pittsburgh) in 2004 initiating a research programme in observational cosmology.

In the 2008 UK government Research Assessment Exercise (RAE2008), 75% of the ICG research was judged to be "Internationally Excellent" or better (3* or 4* status, with 4* being the highest). This ranking places the ICG in the top 6 Applied Maths groups in the UK.

In 2009 the Institute moved from offices in Mercantile House to purpose-built rooms for nearly 50 researchers on the top floor of the Dennis Sciama Building. The building was officially opened by the Astronomer Royal, and former student of Dennis Sciama, Prof Martin Rees.

Roy Maartens was the director of the ICG from January 2002 until October 2010 when he took up a Square Kilometre Array research chair at the University of the Western Cape, South Africa, dividing his time between Portsmouth (30%) and Cape Town (70%). Bob Nichol and David Wands took over as directors, followed by Adam Amara. Since October 2023 the director of the ICG is David Bacon.

== Resources ==
The ICG is a member of the following projects:

- The South East Physics Network Astrophysics collaboration (SEPNet ASTRO)
- The Dark Energy Spectroscopic Instrument (DESI)
- The Sloan Digital Sky Survey (SDSS)
- The Euclid Consortium
- The UK National Cosmology Supercomputer Consortium (COSMOS)
- The Dark Energy Survey (DES)
- The Low Frequency Array (LOFAR) UK consortium
- The European Network for Theoretical Astroparticle Physics (ENTApP) which is one of the Networking Activities of the ILIAS Integrated Infrastructures Initiative
- Galaxy Zoo
- The Spitzer Extragalactic Representative Volume Survey (SERVS)
- The UniMass project

In addition, the University of Portsmouth is home to the SCIAMA supercomputer

- SEPnet Computing Infrastructure for Astrophysical Modelling and Analysis
