= Gaoping (disambiguation) =

Gaoping (高平市) is a county-level city in Shanxi, China.

Gaoping may also refer to:

- Gaoping District (高坪区), a district of Nanchong, Sichuan

== Towns and townships ==
China

- Gaoping, Guizhou, a town in Zunyi, Guizhou
- Gaoping, Liuyang (高坪镇), a township in Liuyang, Hunan
- Gaoping, Longhui (高平镇), a town in Longhui County, Hunan
- Gaoping, Yongshun (高坪乡), a township in Yongshun County, Hunan

Vietnam

- Cao Bang (高平) in historical Jiaozhi, today in Vietnam

== Other uses ==
- Gaoping River (高屏溪), a major river in southern Taiwan
- Gaoping railway station (高坪火车站), in Jianshi County, Hubei
- Nanchong Gaoping Airport (南充高坪机场), an airport in Nanchong, Sichuan
