= Astronomy Centre, University of Sussex =

Research center in England

The Astronomy Centre at the University of Sussex, UK undertakes research in Astronomy, Astrophysics and Cosmology.

== The centre today ==
The Astronomy Centre includes ten permanent research faculty, two teaching faculty, and nine Postdoctoral Research Fellows, together with a community of PhD and MSc students.

Its research is strongly focused on the early Universe, observational cosmology, large-scale structure formation, galaxy clusters, and the formation and evolution of galaxies. These areas are investigated using a combination of theoretical modelling, numerical simulations, and observational techniques.

Members of the Astronomy Centre have participated in a wide range of international collaborations, including the Dark Energy Survey, the Hubble Space Telescope, the Herschel mission, the LOFAR radio telescope, the GAMA survey, the Planck mission, and the POLARBEAR experiment. Researchers are also involved in the DESI project, the 4MOST spectroscopic survey facility, the Square Kilometre Array, the JWST mission, and the Simons Observatory. Staff from the Astronomy Centre were additionally among the founding members of the Virgo Consortium for cosmological supercomputer simulations.

== History ==
The Astronomy Centre began in 1965 with the founding of an MSc course, run jointly with the Royal Observatory, Greenwich, then based at Herstmonceux Castle in East Sussex.

== Alumni ==
The Astronomy Centre has a number of famous former and current members;

- John D. Barrow
- John Gribbin
- Andrew R. Liddle
- William McCrea
- Leon Mestel
- Bernard Pagel
- Martin Rees, Baron Rees of Ludlow
- Roger Tayler
