= Curvaton =

Hypothetical elementary particle

The curvaton is a hypothetical elementary particle which mediates a scalar field in early universe cosmology. It can generate fluctuations during inflation, but does not itself drive inflation, instead it generates curvature perturbations at late times after the inflaton field has decayed and the decay products have redshifted away, when the curvaton is the dominant component of the energy density. It is used to generate a flat spectrum of CMB perturbations in models of inflation where the potential is otherwise too steep or in alternatives to inflation like the pre-Big Bang scenario.

The model was proposed by three groups shortly after one another in 2001: Kari Enqvist and Martin S. Sloth (Sep, 2001), David Wands and David H. Lyth (Oct, 2001), Takeo Moroi and Tomo Takahashi (Oct, 2001).

== See also ==
- Expansion of the universe
- Hubble's law
- Big Bang
- Cosmological constant
- Inflaton
- Cosmological perturbation theory
- Structure formation
- Kari Enqvist
- David Wands
- David H. Lyth
