= David Wands =

British cosmologist

David Wands is professor of cosmology at the Institute of Cosmology and Gravitation, in the University of Portsmouth.

He was educated at Dr Challoner's Grammar School, Amersham, and Gonville and Caius College, Cambridge, where he read Natural Sciences (Physical) and Mathematics. He received his PhD from the University of Sussex in 1994, supervised by John D. Barrow in the Astronomy Centre.

Wands has published numerous research papers on cosmology, the physics of the early universe and the origin of cosmic structure. Wands' research involves investigation of primordial fluctuations in the density and metric of spacetime. He proposed the curvaton model for the origin of cosmic structure, with David H. Lyth in 2001.
