= Bertolami =

Bertolami is an Italian surname.

== Geographical distribution ==
As of 2014, 37.1% of all known bearers of the surname Bertolami were residents of Italy (frequency 1:107,254), 23.0% of the United States (1:1,020,484), 16.0% of Argentina (1:173,754), 9.8% of Brazil (1:1,363,415), 5.2% of France (1:831,344), 3.5% of Belgium (1:212,914), 3.0% of Switzerland (1:178,521) and 1.8% of Portugal (1:372,080).

In Italy, the frequency of the surname was higher than national average (1:107,254) in the following regions:

1. Sicily (1:15,570)
2. Liguria (1:51,852)
3. Calabria (1:58,341)
4. Lazio (1:64,393)

In Argentina, the frequency of the surname was higher than national average (1:173,754) in the following provinces:

1. Entre Ríos Province (1:22,680)
2. Neuquén Province (1:40,800)
3. Buenos Aires (1:91,266)
4. Buenos Aires Province (1:129,916)
5. Chubut Province (1:134,163)

== People ==
- Orfeu Bertolami (born 1959), Brazilian theoretical physicist
