= Lyth bound =

Upper bound on the amount of gravitational waves produced during inflation

In cosmological inflation, within the slow-roll paradigm, the Lyth argument places a theoretical upper bound on the amount of gravitational waves produced during inflation, given the amount of departure from the homogeneity of the cosmic microwave background (CMB).

== Summary ==
- During slow-roll inflation, the ratio of gravitational waves to inhomogeneities of the CMB is correlated to the inflationary potential steepness.
- Temperature inhomogeneities of the CMB were successfully and accurately measured. in the CMB.
- There are current CMB polarization experiments (see this article for instance for an overview of gravitational wave observatories) aimed at measuring the primordial gravitational wave signature in the CMB.
- However, to date, a significant signal of primordial gravitational waves was not detected. Thus the ratio cannot exceed a certain value.
- Thus the steepness of the inflationary potential is bounded.

== Detail ==
The argument was first introduced by David H. Lyth in his 1997 paper "What Would We Learn by Detecting a Gravitational Wave Signal in the Cosmic Microwave Background Anisotropy?" The detailed argument is as follows:

The power spectrum for curvature perturbations $\Psi$ is given by:

$P_{\Psi}(k)=\frac{8\pi}{9k^3}\frac{H^2}{\epsilon M_{pl}^2}\big|_{aH=k}$ ,

Whereas the power spectrum for tensor perturbations is given by:

$P_{h}(k)=\frac{8\pi}{k^3}\frac{H^2}{M_{pl}^2}\big|_{aH=k}$ ,

in which $H$ is the Hubble parameter, $k$ is the wave number, $M_{pl}$ is the Planck mass and $\epsilon$ is the first slow-roll parameter given by $\frac{-\dot{H}}{H^2}$.

Thus the ratio of tensor to scalar power spectra at a certain wave number $k$, denoted as the so-called tensor-to-scalar ratio $r$, is given by:

$r(k)\equiv \frac{P_{\Psi}(k)}{P_{h}(k)}\big|_{aH=k}=\frac{1}{9\epsilon(k)}$.

While strictly speaking $\epsilon$ is a function of $k$, during slow-roll inflation, it is understood to change very mildly, thus it is customary to simply omit the wavenumber dependence.

Additionally, the numeric pre-factor is susceptible to slight changes owing to more detailed calculations but is usually between $\frac{1}{9}\sim \frac{1}{16}$ .

Although the slow-roll parameter is given as above, it was shown that in the slow-roll limit, this parameter can be given by the slope of the inflationary potential such that:

$\epsilon=\frac{1}{2}\left(\frac{\partial_{\phi}V(\phi)}{V(\phi)}\right)^2$, in which $V(\phi)$ is the inflationary potential over a scalar field $\phi$.

Thus, $\left|\frac{\partial_{\phi} V}{V}\right|\propto \sqrt{r}$, and the upper bound on $r$ placed by CMB measurements and the lack of gravitational wave signal is translated to an upper bound on the steepness of the inflationary potential.

== Acceptance and significance ==
Although the Lyth bound argument was adopted relatively slowly, it has been used in many subsequent theoretical works. The original argument deals only with the original inflationary time period that is reflected in the CMB signature, which at the time were about 5 e-folds, as opposed to about 8 e-folds to date. However, an effort was made to generalize this argument to the entire span of physical inflation, which corresponds to the order of 50 to 60 e-folds

On the base of these generalized arguments, an unnecessary constraining view arose, which preferred realization of inflation based in large-field models, as opposed to small-field models. This view was prevalent until the last decade which saw a revival in small-field model prevalence due to the theoretical works that pointed to possible likely small-field model candidates. The likelihood of these models was further developed and numerically demonstrated.
