= Open Journal of Astrophysics =

Peer-reviewed scientific journal

- Cover image of OJAp
- Discipline: Astronomy, astrophysics
- Language: English
- Edited by: Peter Coles

Publication details
- History: 2019-present
- Publisher: Maynooth Academic Publishing (Ireland)
- Frequency: continuous
- Open access: Diamond
- License: CC-BY
- Impact factor: 6.8 (unofficial) (2025)
- ISO 4: Find out here

Indexing
- ISSN: 2565-6120

Links
- Journal homepage

Open Journal of Astrophysics (OJAp) is a peer-reviewed scientific journal in astronomy and astrophysics. It publishes original research in the form of scientific papers.

OJAp is a relatively new academic journal in astrophysics. Over the past few years, it has rapidly gained traction, after several other formerly free-to-publish journals in astronomy and astrophysics changed to have high fees. A founding motivation for OJAp was to avoid unnecessarily costly subscriptions to academic journals for universities, and article processing fees for authors.

The typical time from submission to acceptance is 2–3 months. In 2023 the journal published 50 articles, increasing to 121 in 2024, while in 2025 the journal published 214 articles, according to Harvard ADS. This makes it roughly ten times smaller than the most known and used astronomy journals, such as MNRAS. Professors from the top international astronomy and astrophysics research institutions, including Princeton, Caltech, MIT, and Harvard now regularly publish in OJAp.

== Content ==
OJAp applies a simple criterion for determining whether a paper is acceptable for publication: namely, if and only if it is suitable for the astro-ph section of the arXiv. Therefore, the following six broad topics are covered: Astrophysics of Galaxies, Cosmology and Nongalactic Astrophysics, Earth and Planetary Astrophysics, High Energy Astrophysical Phenomena, Instrumentation and Methods for Astrophysics, and Solar and Stellar Astrophysics.

Using Harvard ADS and counting only refereed citations:

OJAp Publication Statistics
Year	Number of Publications	Total Citations	H-index	Impact Factor
2025	214	1,373	17	6.8
2024	121	1,627	21	6.1
2023	50	1,313	19	3.7
2022	17	222	9	4.2
2021	17	585	8	7.8
2020	15	314	8	-
2019	12	1,658	10	-
2018	1	-	-	-

== Open access ==
OJAp is an arXiv-overlay, diamond open access journal. As a result, all articles are by definition free to read online as soon as they submitted, under a Creative Commons Attribution (CC-BY) licence. There are no subscription fees for authors, or readers.

OJAp does not yet have an Clarivate impact factor. However, internal analysis calculates an IF of 7.15 (in 2021). The journal is indexed on Scopus, with a SCImago journal rank (SJR) of 0.726 (2024), placing in the second quartile. Ongoing shifts in research priorities towards Open Science will be essential for the widespread adoption and recognition of community-led journals such as OJAp.

== See also ==
- The Astrophysical Journal
- Astronomy & Astrophysics
- Monthly Notices of the Royal Astronomical Society
