= David H. Lyth =

Professor David Lyth (21 June 1940) is a researcher in particle cosmology at the University of Lancaster. He has published over 165 papers as well as two books on early universe cosmology and cosmological inflation.

== Research ==
He is noted for his work in the area of inflation model building and the observational consequences of models of inflation. In 1997, he discovered the Lyth bound which relates the tensor-scalar ratio of perturbations in the CMB to the variation of the inflaton field during inflation. He proposed the Curvaton Scenario in 2001, with David Wands of Portsmouth University. He was awarded the Fred Hoyle Medal and Prize in 2012.

== Books ==
- Cosmological Inflation and Large Scale Structure (2000), with Andrew Liddle, ISBN 0-521-57598-2
- The Primordial Density Perturbation (2009), with Andrew Liddle, ISBN 0-521-82849-X
- Cosmology for Physicists (2016)
- The History of the Universe (2016)
