= David Matravers =

British cosmologist (1937–2022)

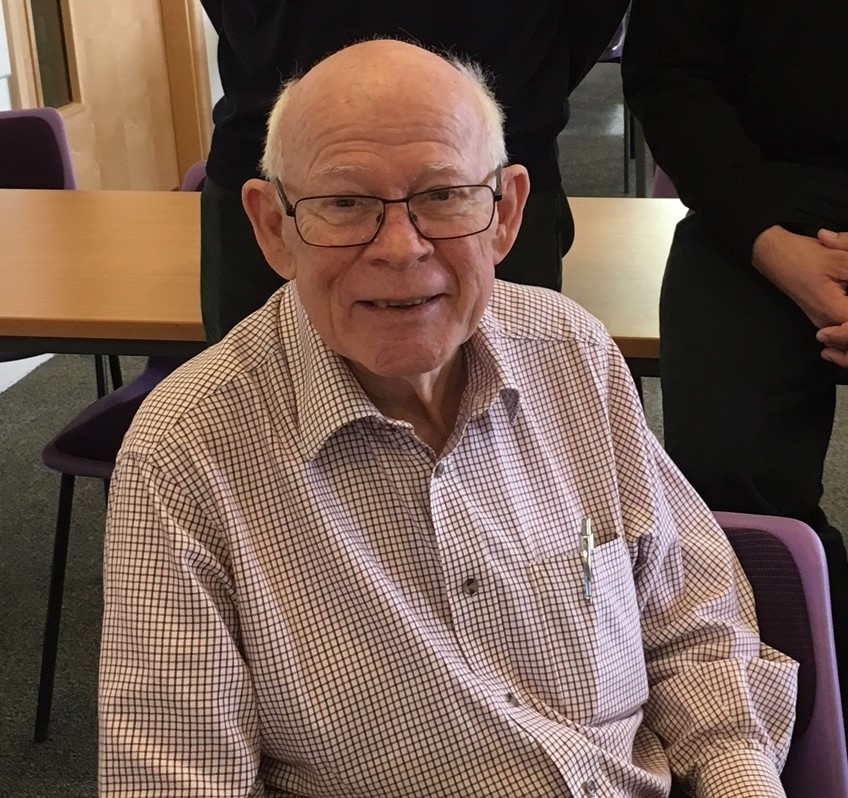
- 2017
- Born: 1937
- Died: 2022 (aged 84)
- Known for: Cosmology

David Matravers (26 September 1937 – 31 May 2022) was a British mathematician and cosmologist and Professor of Mathematics at the University of Portsmouth. His research interests were in Applied Mathematics and Theoretical Cosmology.

He founded the Institute of Cosmology and Gravitation at the University of Portsmouth.

== Biography ==
Following BSc and MSc studies at Natal and UNISA, he did his PhD at Rhodes University in South Africa under the supervision of Hanno Rund in 1972.

In 1990 David Matravers joined the University of Portsmouth as Head of School of Mathematical Studies, and became Head of School of Computer Science and Mathematics in 1997. At Portsmouth he founded a research group in General Relativity and Cosmology, that in 2002 became the Institute of Cosmology and Gravitation.

== Publications ==
David Matravers published more than 50 research papers in General Relativity and cosmology.

In 2019 he published the book "How Cosmologists Explain the Universe to Friends and Family", with Karim A. Malik, ISBN 978-3-030-32733-0.
