= Adrian Melott =

American physicist (born 1947)

- Born: January 7, 1947 (age 79); Moundsville, West Virginia, U.S.
- Education: University of Texas at Austin
- Known for: Cosmology, astrobiology, paleontology, and geophysics
- Scientific career
- Fields: Physics
- Workplaces: University of Texas at Austin; University of Pittsburgh; Moscow State University (IREX Fellow); University of Chicago (Enrico Fermi Postdoctoral Fellow); University of Kansas
- Doctoral advisor: Dennis Sciama

Adrian Lewis Melott (born January 7, 1947) is an American physicist. He is one of the pioneers of using large-scale computing to investigate the formation of large-scale structure in a Universe dominated by dark matter. He later turned his attention to an area he calls "astrobiophysics", examining a variety of ways that external events in our galaxy may have influenced the course of life on Earth, including analysis of gamma-ray burst events.

== Life ==
Born in Moundsville, West Virginia, his early scientific interest was in physical chemistry, but later changed to study physics at Bethany College in West Virginia.

He became active in the antiwar and educational movements of the 60's, and was drawn into the Unitarian ministry. He attended Starr King School for the Ministry in Berkeley, California and was minister in Tampa, Florida for 7 years. During this time he continued his interest in physics. In 1977 he entered the physics program at the University of Texas at Austin where he met and quickly decided to work with noted cosmologist Dennis W. Sciama. He was among one of three groups who had initiated the numerical simulation of the formation of structure in a Universe dominated by dark matter.

He received his Ph.D. in 1981, and followed with postdoctoral work with Arthur M. Wolfe at Pittsburgh, with the group of Yakov Borisovich Zel'dovich in Moscow, and as Enrico Fermi Postdoctoral Fellow at the University of Chicago. In 1986 he joined the faculty of the University of Kansas, where he has been ever since.

In 1998–2001, he was active in the "controversy" surrounding evolution in the public school curriculum in Kansas. In 2002, he received the Joseph Burton Forum Award for his central role in organizing public support for the return of modern evolutionary biology to the Kansas public school curriculum

He is married to Gillian, and has two sons, Christopher and Jesse.

== Research ==
His work in dark matter focused on the formation of what has come to be called the "cosmic web" from Zeldovich pancakes. In 1983, before the existence of such structure was generally accepted, he and collaborators predicted its existence in a Universe dominated by cold dark matter. Later in the 80's, he worked with J. Richard Gott on the topology of large-scale structure, then with Sergei Shandarin on the merging of hierarchical clustering models with the Zel'dovich pancake picture as a description of large-scale structure.

Beginning in 2003, he made an abrupt transition into a new area which began by examining the effects the radiation from a gamma-ray burst (GRB) would have upon the Earth, and investigating a possible connection between a GRB and the Late Ordovician Mass Extinction. Later, he investigated the Late Devonian Mass Extinction and its potential association with cataclysmic supernovae, the effects of an end-Pliocene supernova on marine megafauna and on human evolution, the controversial and disputed Younger Dryas impact hypothesis, the effects of the 774-775 carbon-14 spike and its association with a solar flare, and the Tunguska event. He is also a member of the Comet Research Group, which is best known for sponsoring a collaboration with biblical archaeologists who believe they have discovered the ancient city of Sodom at Tell el-Hammam, Jordan, and that it was destroyed by a comet. On February 15, 2023, the following editor's note was posted on this group's paper, "Readers are alerted that concerns raised about the data presented and the conclusions of this article are being considered by the Editors. A further editorial response will follow the resolution of these issues." He showed that 27 and 62 million-year oscillations in fossil biodiversity cut across a variety of data sets and has found clues to their cause, which, however, is still an unsolved problem.

Melott is a member of the Paleontological Society. He was elected Fellow of the American Physical Society "For groundbreaking studies of the origin and evolution of cosmic structure" in 1996, and received its Joseph A. Burton Forum Award for his educational work in 2002. In 2007, he was elected Fellow of the American Association for the Advancement of Science "For distinguished contributions to cosmological large-scale structure, for organizing public support for teaching evolution, and for interdisciplinary research on astrophysical impacts on the biosphere."

== See also ==
- Ordovician–Silurian extinction event
