= The Large Scale Structure of Space-Time =

1973 treatise by Hawking and Ellis

- Cover of the first edition
- Authors: Stephen Hawking; George Ellis
- Language: English
- Subject: General relativity
- Genre: Non-fiction
- Publisher: Cambridge University Press
- Publication date: 1973
- Publication place: United Kingdom
- Media type: Print (Hardcover and Paperback)
- Pages: 384
- ISBN: 978-0521200165

The Large Scale Structure of Space-Time is a 1973 treatise on the theoretical physics of spacetime by the physicist Stephen Hawking and the mathematician George Ellis. It is intended for specialists in general relativity rather than newcomers or the general public.

== Background ==
In the mid-1970s, advances in the technologies of astronomical observations—radio, infrared, and X-ray astronomy—enabled exploration of the Universe at large. New tools became necessary. In this book, Hawking and Ellis attempt to establish the axiomatic foundation for the geometry of four-dimensional spacetime as described by Albert Einstein's general theory of relativity and to derive its physical consequences for singularities, horizons, and causality. Whereas the tools for studying Euclidean geometry were a straightedge and a compass, those needed to investigate curved spacetime are test particles and light rays. According to the mathematical physicist John Baez from the University of California, Riverside, The Large Scale Structure of Space-Time was the first book to offer a detailed account of the "revolutionary" techniques in differential topology developed by Roger Penrose and Hawking.

This book was based on previous work by Hawking, Penrose, and Robert Geroch on the causal structure of spacetime. Hawking co-wrote the book with Ellis, while he was a postdoctoral fellow at the University of Cambridge.

The book, now considered a classic, has also appeared in paperback format and has been reprinted many times.^{a} A fiftieth anniversary edition was published by Cambridge University Press in February 2023.

== Table of contents ==
- Preface
- 1. The Role of Gravity
- 2. Differential Geometry
- 3. General Relativity
- 4. The Physical Significance of Curvature
- 5. Exact Solutions
- 6. Causal Structure
- 7. The Cauchy Problem in General Relativity
- 8. Space-time Singularities
- 9. Gravitational Collapse and Black Holes
- 10. The Initial Singularity of the Universe
- Appendix A: Translation of An Essay by P. S. Laplace
- Appendix B: Spherically Symmetric Solutions of Birkhoff's Theorem.
- References
- Notation
- Index

== Assessment ==
Mathematician Nicholas Michael John Woodhouse at the University of Oxford considered this book to be an authoritative treatise that could become a classic. He observed that the authors begin with axioms of geometry and physics then derive the consequences in a rigorous fashion. Various well-known exact solutions to Einstein's field equations and their physical meaning are explored. In particular, Hawking and Ellis show that singularities and black holes arise in a large class of plausible solutions. He warned that although this book is self-contained, it is more suitable for specialists rather than new students as it is heavy-going and contains no exercises. He noted that despite the authors' attempt at a rigorous treatment, certain technical terms, such as Lie groups, are used but never explained, and that modern coordinate-free methods are introduced, but not used effectively.

Theoretical physicist Rainer Sachs from the University of California, Berkeley, observed that The Large-Scale Structure of Space-Time was published within just a few years as Gravitation and Cosmology by Steven Weinberg and Gravitation by Charles Misner, Kip Thorne, and John Archibald Wheeler. He believed these three books can supplement each other and lead students to the forefront of research. Whereas Hawking and Ellis employ global analysis extensively but say relatively little about perturbative methods, the other two books neglect global analysis and cover in great detail perturbations. He believed Hawking and Ellis did a great job summarizing recent developments in the field (as of 1974) and that the intended audience is a doctoral student (or higher) with a strong mathematical background and prior exposure to general relativity. He argued that the core of the books consists of two chapters, Chapter 4 on the significance of spacetime curvature and Chapter 6 on causal structure, and that the most interesting application is the penultimate chapter on black holes. He noted that mathematical arguments are at times difficult to follow and suggested Techniques of Differential Topology in Relativity by Roger Penrose for reference. He also noticed a small number of errors, though none affect the general conclusions drawn by the authors. He thought that this book is a "model" presentation on the interplay between mathematics and physics that could become highly influential in the future.

Theoretical physicist John Archibald Wheeler of Princeton University recommended this book to anyone interested in the implications of general relativity for cosmology, the singularity theorems, and the physics of black holes, presented in an almost Euclidean fashion, though he acknowledged that this is not a textbook due to its lack of examples and exercises. He praised its 62 illustrative diagrams.

== See also ==
- Mathematics of general relativity
- List of books on general relativity

== Notes ==
1. Hawking, S. W.; Ellis, G. F. R. (1973). The Large Scale Structure of Space-Time. Cambridge University Press. ISBN 0-521-09906-4.
