= Brandenberger–Vafa mechanism =

Argument in string theory

In string theory, the Brandenberger–Vafa mechanism is an argument for why the observable universe has one macroscopic timelike and three macroscopic spacelike dimensions. Its importance stems from the fact that string theory contains additional dimensions rolled up in Planck scale, as described by Kaluza–Klein compactification. In simple terms, the argument connected with brane cosmology claims that strings and branes wrapped around compactified dimensions cause an energy barrier, which permits their unfolding. The Brandenberger–Vafa mechanism is named after Robert Brandenberger and Cumrun Vafa, who first described it in 1989.

== Formulation ==
On the basis of ten total dimensions in superstring theory, Brandenberger and Vafa argue why four dimensions "decompactify" instead of why six dimensions compactify. They begin by modelling spacelike dimensions topologically as a nine-dimensional torus $T^9=(S^1)^9$ so that each dimension can do so separately. They furthermore assume every dimension to be of same size $R$, meaning the torus is $\mathbb{R}^9/R\mathbb{Z}^9$ geometrically. As remarked later, this size $R$ should be treated quantum theoretically, although they don't do so themselves. In ordinary cosmology, models like the Friedmann–Lemaître–Robertson–Walker metric derived from Einstein's field equations can be used to get the size $R$ in dependence of the time $t$ (with $R\propto t^{1/2}$) as well as the temperature $T$ in dependence of the size $R$ (with $T\propto 1/R$). Since there is no known analogy of Einstein's field equations in string theory, Brandenberger and Vafa use a different argument to obtain the latter, with the argument having to be modified for small sizes $R$ as the temperature $T$ can then exceed the Hagedorn temperature. This is done using its T-duality $T(R)=T(1/R)$ with no physical singularity for $R\rightarrow 0$.

== Literature ==
- Robert, Brandenberger; Vafa, Cumrun (1989-04-10). "Superstrings in the Early Universe". Nuclear Physics B. 391–410 (2): 391–410. doi:10.1016/0550-3213(89)90037-0.
- Scott, Watson; Robert, Brandenberger (2003-07-04). "Stabilization of Extra Dimensions at Tree Level". Journal of Cosmology and Astroparticle Physics (11): 008. arXiv:hep-th/0307044. doi:10.1088/1475-7516/2003/11/008.
- Greene, Brian; Kabat, Daniel; Marnerides, Stefanos (2012-12-10). "On three dimensions as the preferred dimensionality of space via the Brandenberger-Vafa mechanism". Physical Review D. 88 (4) 043527. arXiv:1212.2115. doi:10.1103/PhysRevD.88.043527.
- Robert, Brandenberger; Easson, Damien A.; Kimberly, Dagny (2001-09-20). "Loitering Phase in Brane Gas Cosmology". Nuclear Physics B. 623 (1–2): 421–436. arXiv:hep-th/0109165. doi:10.1016/S0550-3213(01)00636-8.
- Kim, Jin Young (2006-08-18). "Stabilization of the Extra Dimensions in Brane Gas Cosmology with Bulk Flux". Physics Letters B. 652: 43–52. arXiv:hep-th/0608131. doi:10.1016/S0550-3213(01)00636-8.
