= George F. R. Ellis =

South African cosmologist (born 1939)

George F R Ellis
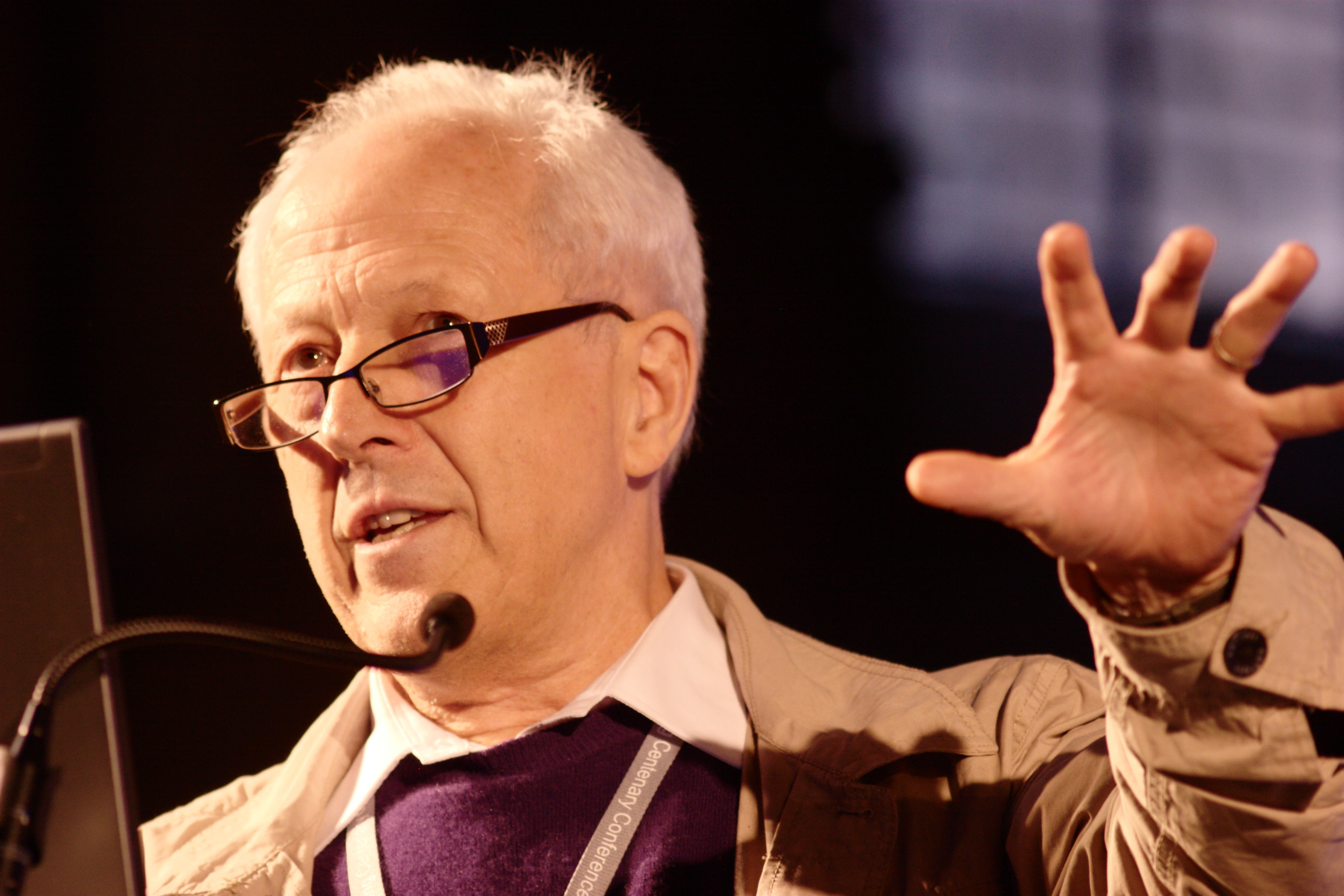
- Born: George Francis Rayner Ellis; 11 August 1939 (age 87); Johannesburg, South Africa
- Education: Michaelhouse; University of Cape Town; St John's College, Cambridge
- Known for: Theoretical physical cosmology
- Awards: Templeton Prize 2004; Prix Georges Lemaître 2019
- Scientific career
- Fields: Cosmology
- Workplaces: University of Cambridge; SISSA
- Doctoral advisor: Dennis W. Sciama

George Francis Rayner Ellis, FRS, Hon. FRSSAf (born 11 August 1939), is the emeritus distinguished professor of complex systems in the Department of Mathematics and Applied Mathematics at the University of Cape Town in South Africa. He co-authored The Large Scale Structure of Space-Time with University of Cambridge astrophysicist Stephen Hawking, published in 1973, and is considered one of the world's leading theorists in cosmology. From 1989 to 1992 he served as president of the International Society on General Relativity and Gravitation. He is a past president of the International Society for Science and Religion. He is an A-rated researcher with the NRF.

Ellis, an active Quaker, was a vocal opponent of apartheid during the National Party reign in the 1970s and 1980s, and it is during this period that Ellis's research focused on the more philosophical aspects of cosmology, for which he won the Templeton Prize in 2004. He was also awarded the Order of the Star of South Africa by Nelson Mandela in 1999. On 18 May 2007, he was elected a fellow of the British Royal Society.

== Life ==
Born in 1939 to George Rayner Ellis, a newspaper editor, and Gwendoline Hilda MacRobert Ellis in Johannesburg, George Francis Rayner Ellis attended the University of Cape Town, where he graduated with honours in 1960 with a Bachelor of Science degree in physics with distinction. He represented the university in fencing, rowing and flying.

While a student at St John's College, Cambridge, where he received a PhD in applied maths and theoretical physics in 1964, he was on college rowing teams.

At Cambridge, Ellis served as a research fellow from 1965 to 1967, was assistant lecturer in the Department of Applied Mathematics and Theoretical Physics until 1970, and was then appointed university lecturer, serving until 1974.

Ellis became a visiting professor at the Enrico Fermi Institute at the University of Chicago in 1970, a lecturer at the Cargese Summer School in Corsica in 1971 and the Erice Summer School in Sicily in 1972, and a visiting H3 professor at the University of Hamburg, also in 1972.

The following year, Ellis co-wrote The Large Scale Structure of Space-Time with Stephen Hawking, debuting at a strategic moment in the development of General Relativity Theory.

In the following year, Ellis returned to South Africa to accept an appointment as professor of applied mathematics at the University of Cape Town, a position he held until his retirement in 2005.

In 2005 Ellis appeared as a guest speaker at the Nobel Conference in St. Peter, Minnesota.

== Work ==
George Ellis has worked for many decades on anisotropic cosmologies (Bianchi models) and inhomogeneous universes, and on the philosophy of cosmology. He is currently writing on the emergence of complexity, and the way this is enabled by top-down causation in the hierarchy of complexity. Ellis has also collaborated with Teppo Felin, Denis Noble, and Jan Koenderink on a set of articles published in the journal Genome Biology in 2021. In terms of philosophy of science, Ellis is a Platonist.

== Publications ==
=== Books ===
- ——; Hawking, S.W. (1973). The Large Scale Structure of Space-Time. Cambridge: University Press. ISBN 978-0-521-20016-5.
- ——; Dewar, David (1979). Low Income Housing Policy in South Africa. Urban Problems Research Unit, UCT.
- ——; Williams, Ruth (1988). Flat and Curved Space Times (2000 revised ed.). Oxford University Press.
- —— (1993). Before the Beginning: Cosmology Explained. Bowerdean/Marion Boyars.
- ——; Lanza, A.; Miller, J. (1993). The Renaissance of General Relativity and Cosmology (2005 paperback ed.). Cambridge: University Press.
- —— (1994). Science Research Policy in South Africa. Royal Society of South Africa.
- ——; Murphy, Nancey (1996). On The Moral Nature of the universe: Cosmology, Theology, and Ethics. Fortress Press.
- ——; Wainwright, John, eds. (1997). Dynamical Systems in Cosmology. Cambridge: Cambridge University Press. ISBN 978-0-521-55457-2.
- ——; Coles, Peter (1997). Is The Universe Open or Closed? The Density of Matter in the Universe. Cambridge Lecture Notes in Physics, vol. 7. Cambridge: University Press. ISBN 978-0-521-56689-6.
- ——, ed. (2002). The Far Future Universe: Eschatology from a Cosmic Perspective. Templeton Foundation Press. ISBN 978-1-890151-90-4.
- —— (2004). Science in Faith and Hope: an interaction. Quaker Books.
- —— (2004a). Science and Ultimate Reality: Quantum Theory, Cosmology and Complexity. Cambridge: University Press. ISBN 978-0-521-83113-0.
- —— (2006). Handbook in Philosophy of Physics. Elsevier. ISBN 978-0-444-53002-8.
- ——; Maartens, Roy; MacCallum, Malcolm A. H. (2012). Relativistic Cosmology. Cambridge: University Press.
- —— (2016). How Can Physics Underlie the Mind? Top-Down Causation in the Human Context. Springer.

=== Papers ===
Ellis has over 500 published articles; including 17 in Nature. Notable papers include:

- —— (1978). "Is the universe expanding?". General Relativity and Gravitation. 9 (2): 87–94. Bibcode:1978GReGr...9...87E. doi:10.1007/BF00760145. ISSN 0001-7701. S2CID 122166325.
- ——; Bruni, M. (1989). "Covariant and gauge-invariant approach to cosmological density fluctuations". Physical Review D. 40 (6): 1804–1818. Bibcode:1989PhRvD..40.1804E. doi:10.1103/PhysRevD.40.1804. ISSN 0556-2821. PMID 10012011.
- ——; Bruni, Marco; Dunsby, Peter K. S. (1992). "Cosmological perturbations and the physical meaning of gauge-invariant variables". The Astrophysical Journal. 395: 34. Bibcode:1992ApJ...395...34B. doi:10.1086/171629. ISSN 0004-637X.
- ——; Coles, Peter (1994). "The case for an open Universe". Nature. 370 (6491): 609–615. Bibcode:1994Natur.370..609C. doi:10.1038/370609a0. ISSN 0028-0836. S2CID 4282835.
- ——; van Elst, Henk (1999). "Cosmological models (Cargèse Lectures 1998)". Natoadv.studyinst.ser.c.math.phys.sci. 541: 1–116. arXiv:gr-qc/9812046v5. Bibcode:1999ASIC..541....1E.
- ——; Virbhadra, K. S. (2000). "Schwarzschild black hole lensing". Physical Review D. 62 (8) 084003. arXiv:astro-ph/9904193. Bibcode:2000PhRvD..62h4003V. doi:10.1103/PhysRevD.62.084003. ISSN 0556-2821. S2CID 15956589.
- ——; Virbhadra, K. S. (2002). "Gravitational lensing by naked singularities". Physical Review D. 65 (10) 103004. Bibcode:2002PhRvD..65j3004V. doi:10.1103/PhysRevD.65.103004. ISSN 0556-2821.
- —— (2005). "Physics, complexity and causality". Nature. 435 (7043): 743. Bibcode:2005Natur.435..743E. doi:10.1038/435743a. ISSN 0028-0836. PMID 15944681. S2CID 35850757.
- —— (2012a). "Top down causation and emergence: some comments on mechanisms". Interface Focus. 2 (2): 126–140. doi:10.1098/rsfs.2011.0062. PMC 3262299. PMID 23386967.

== Honours ==
In 2019 Rhodes University in Grahamstown announced that it would award Ellis an honorary doctorate in laws (LLD, hc).

== See also ==
- List of science and religion scholars
