= David Francis Bacon =

American physician

David Francis Bacon (November 30, 1813 – January 23, 1865) was an American medical doctor and writer. He published three books:

- Memoirs of Eminently Pious Women of Britain and America (1833)
- Lives of the Apostles (1836)
- Wanderings on the Seas and Shores of Africa (1843)

== Obituary ==
He was a son of Rev. David Bacon, (well known as one of the missionary pioneers of Ohio and Michigan), and was born November 30, 1813, in Prospect, Connecticut. He graduated from Yale College in 1831 and Yale Medical School in 1836. A short time afterwards he was sent out by the American Colonization Society, as principal colonial physician in Liberia.

After his return from Liberia, he published three parts of a work entitled Wanderings on the Seas and Shores of Africa, in which his observations on the west coast of that country are very minutely recorded (N. Y. 1843. 8vo)

During most of his life he resided in New York, and at one time he was actively engaged in political affairs, as an earnest advocate of the election of Henry Clay to the Presidency. He was a frequent contributor to the periodicals of the day. In 1835 he published a work, evincing much research, entitled Lives of the Apostles. He died in the city of New York, January 23, 1865, aged 51 years.

This article incorporates public domain material from the Yale Obituary Record.
