= David Bacon (cosmologist) =

British physicist and academic

- Education: University of Cambridge
- Scientific career
- Workplaces: Institute of Cosmology and Gravitation, University of Portsmouth
- Thesis: The detection and measurement of cosmic shear. (2002)
- Website: https://www.port.ac.uk/about-us/structure-and-governance/our-people/our-staff/david-bacon/

David Bacon is a British cosmologist who is professor and director of the Institute of Cosmology and Gravitation at the University of Portsmouth. He researches the large-scale structure of the universe, particularly through cosmic shear. He is involved in several international collaborations.

== Early life and education ==
Bacon first thought about becoming a scientist around the age of 13, inspired by enthusiastic teachers at school. Bacon completed an undergraduate degree at the University of Cambridge, where he stayed for a doctoral degree at the Institute of Astronomy, studying weak gravitational lensing and using it to constrain the structure of matter in the universe.

== Research and career ==
Bacon is interested in constraining and testing cosmology with multiple observables, in particular using weak gravitational lensing to constrain the matter power spectrum. Gravitational lensing is the bending of light from distant sources by massive objects along the line of sight. Measuring the average effect of lensing across many sources allows the structure of the matter in between to be determined. During his PhD, Bacon was lead author on one of four independent papers that first detected cosmic shear.

Bacon is a member of many international collaborations. He has been heavily involved with the Dark Energy Survey, leading the groups assembling the dark matter maps, and is now a member of the Euclid Collaboration. He is interested in radio cosmology and is the Portsmouth representative in the Low-Frequency Array (LOFAR) collaboration, where he was previously joint lead of the cosmology working group, and is a member of the Square Kilometre Array cosmology science working group. Bacon is also a member of the LISA collaboration.

After completing his PhD, Bacon joined the University of Edinburgh on two fellowships. He moved to the University of Portsmouth in 2007, becoming associate director of the Institute of Cosmology and Gravitation (ICG) in 2019 and director in 2023. He has been heavily involved in the ICG's space science collaborations, working with Space South Central.

=== Selected publications ===
- Bacon, David; Refregier, Alexandre; Ellis, Richard (October 2000). "Detection of weak gravitational lensing by large-scale structure". MNRAS. 318 (2): 625–640. arXiv:astro-ph/0003008. Bibcode:2000MNRAS.318..625B. doi:10.1046/j.1365-8711.2000.03851.x. S2CID 10710233.
- Abbott, T. M. C.; et al. (DES Collaboration) (13 January 2022). "Dark Energy Survey Year 3 results: Cosmological constraints from galaxy clustering and weak lensing". Physical Review D. 105 (2) 023520. arXiv:2105.13549. Bibcode:2022PhRvD.105b3520A. doi:10.1103/PhysRevD.105.023520. S2CID 268248699.
- Amendola, Luca; et al. (The Euclid Theory Working Group) (12 April 2018). "Cosmology and fundamental physics with the Euclid satellite". Living Reviews in Relativity. 21 (1): 2. arXiv:1606.00180. Bibcode:2018LRR....21....2A. doi:10.1007/s41114-017-0010-3. PMC 5897888. PMID 29674941. S2CID 25086630.
