= David Bacon (missionary) =

American missionary

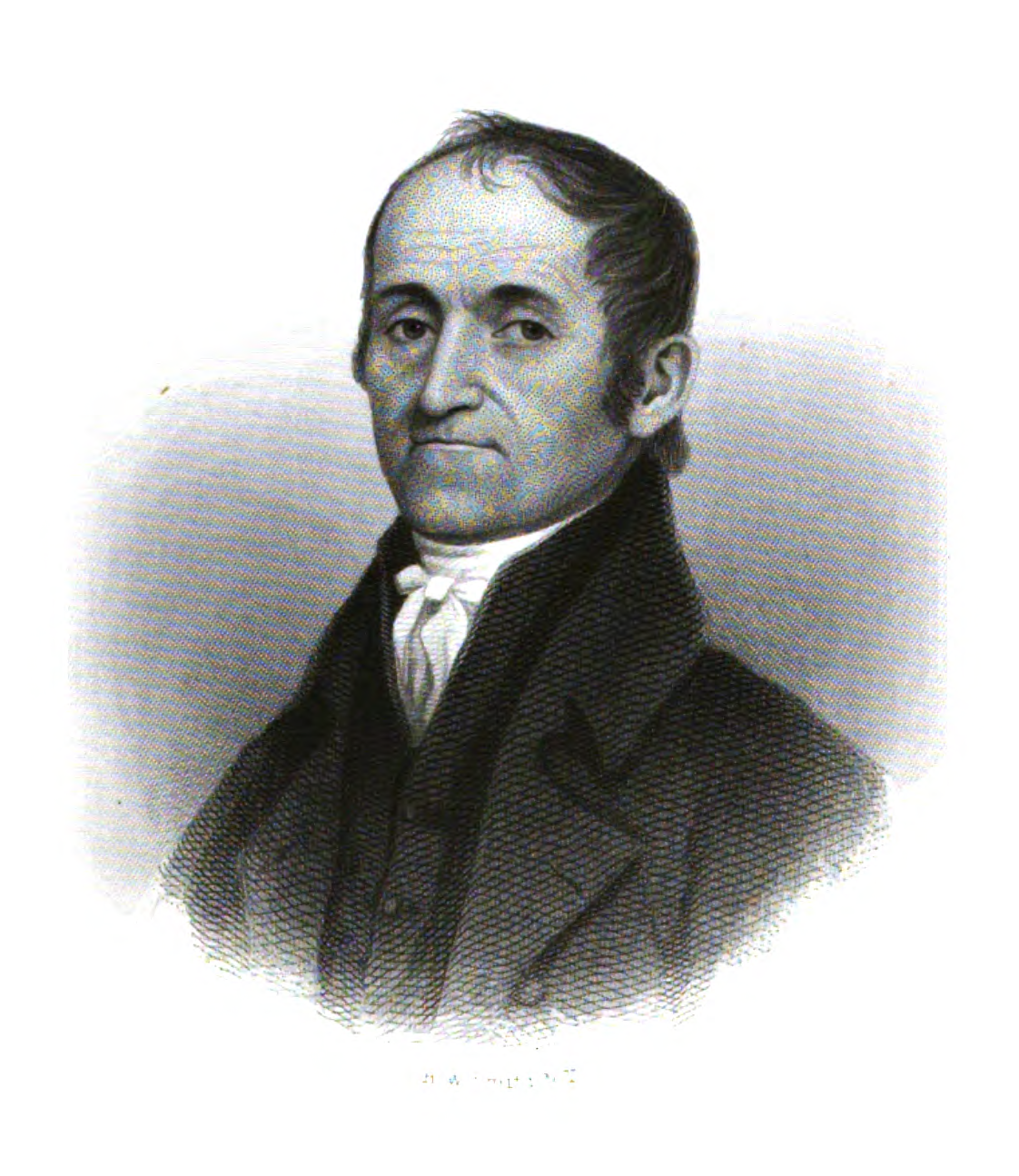
- Born: 1771; Woodstock, Connecticut
- Died: 27 August 1817 (aged 45–46); Hartford, Connecticut
- Children: Leonard Bacon; Delia Bacon; David Francis Bacon

David Bacon (1771 – 27 August 1817) was an American missionary in Michigan Territory. He was born in Woodstock, Connecticut. He worked primarily with the Ottawa and Chippewa tribes, although they were not particularly receptive to his Christian teachings. He founded the town of Tallmadge, Ohio, which later became the center of the Congregationalist faith in Ohio. He died in Hartford, Connecticut.

He was the father of Rev. Leonard Bacon and the writer Delia Bacon, best known for her work on the Shakespeare authorship question.
