= Hume Feldman =

Astrophysicist

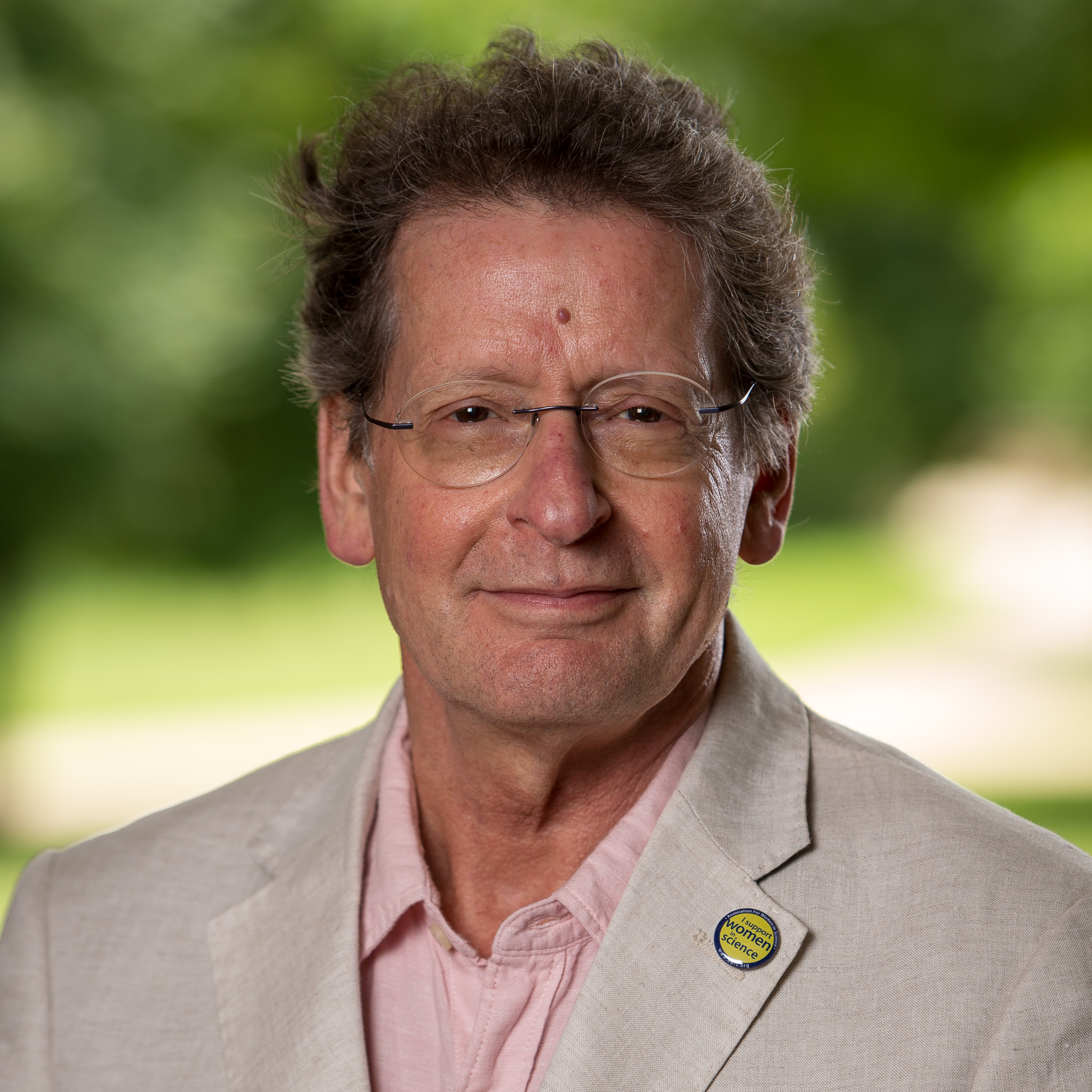
Hume Feldman, 2019

Hume A. Feldman is a physicist specializing in cosmology and astrophysics. He is a Fellow of the American Physical Society and a professor and chair (2013-2023) of the Department of Physics and Astronomy at the University of Kansas.

== Education ==
Feldman graduated from the University of California, Santa Cruz in 1983. He got his PhD at Stony Brook University in NY, 1989 working with Robert Brandenberger. He was then a postdoc at the Canadian Institute for Theoretical Astrophysics, Toronto, 1989–91, a research fellow at the University of Michigan 1991-94 and a Prof. Research in the Physics Department at Princeton University 1994–96.

== Research career ==
Hume has been a researcher in the study of the large-scale peculiar velocity field for the past two decades. His explanation of the systematic errors, aliasing and incomplete cancellations of small-scale noise masquerading as large-scale signal lead to the reemergence of peculiar velocities as a premier tool in our arsenal to probe the dynamics and statistics of the large-scale structure of the Universe. He developed a formalism to optimize the determination of cosmic flows from proper distance surveys and enabled for the first time direct comparison of independent surveys and cosmological models as a function of scale, thus establishing the cosmological significance of flow probes.

His work has led to many widely cited results (such as a nearly 3-sigma flows on 100 Mpc/h scales), renewed discussion of imposing flow constraints on cosmological models and the redesign of proper distance surveys. He is the coauthor of two recent papers that brought back this field from a decade with no new data (with over 300 and 200 citations, respectively). Hume was a coauthor of the best-cited article on cosmological perturbations (>4000 citations) developing a gauge invariant formalism that is widely considered to be the gold standard in this sub- discipline. His seminal work on the approximation of the matter power spectrum from redshift surveys (>1000 citations) has opened the door to a whole industry of cosmological probes and N-point functions determination in Fourier space. He was a coauthor on the "Loitering Universe" series of papers that predicted an accelerating universe as a solution to the age problem in 1992 and which included a scalar field that acted like an effective cosmological constant or a quintessence field years before the supernovae type IA results.

He worked extensively on the constraints on galaxy bias, matter density, and primordial non-Gaussianity in redshift surveys and his detection of the bispectrum signal was the first observational confirmation of the Gravitational Instability Model. He helped develop an artificial neural network formalism to interpolate the fully non-linear power spectrum of matter fluctuation and provided the community with a fast and accurate (<1% errors) software to determine the non-linear power spectrum given an input cosmology.

His APS Fellow Citation reads:

For his contributions to cosmology, particularly cosmological perturbations, the statistical and dynamical properties of the large scale structure of the universe, the innovative treatment of cosmic peculiar velocity fields, and the imposition of constraints on cosmological parameters. Nominated by: Division of Astrophysics

== Public activities ==
He travels widely for presentations to a diverse array of groups, from elementary to high school students to churches, interest groups, legislators and professional societies. He became involved in the Creationism/Intelligent Design in Kansas in 1999 when the nearly successful attempts of various fundamentalist groups to force the teaching of religion in public schools began in earnest. Hume was one of the leaders of a group of academics and educators that addressed, publicized and confronted the issue head on by organizing conferences, public forums and workshops, and through political advocacy including testimonials to the Kansas legislatures, providing high school science teachers with the tools and knowledge to discuss these issues locally to parents, students and the interested public.
