= Mark Trodden =

English physicist (born 1968)

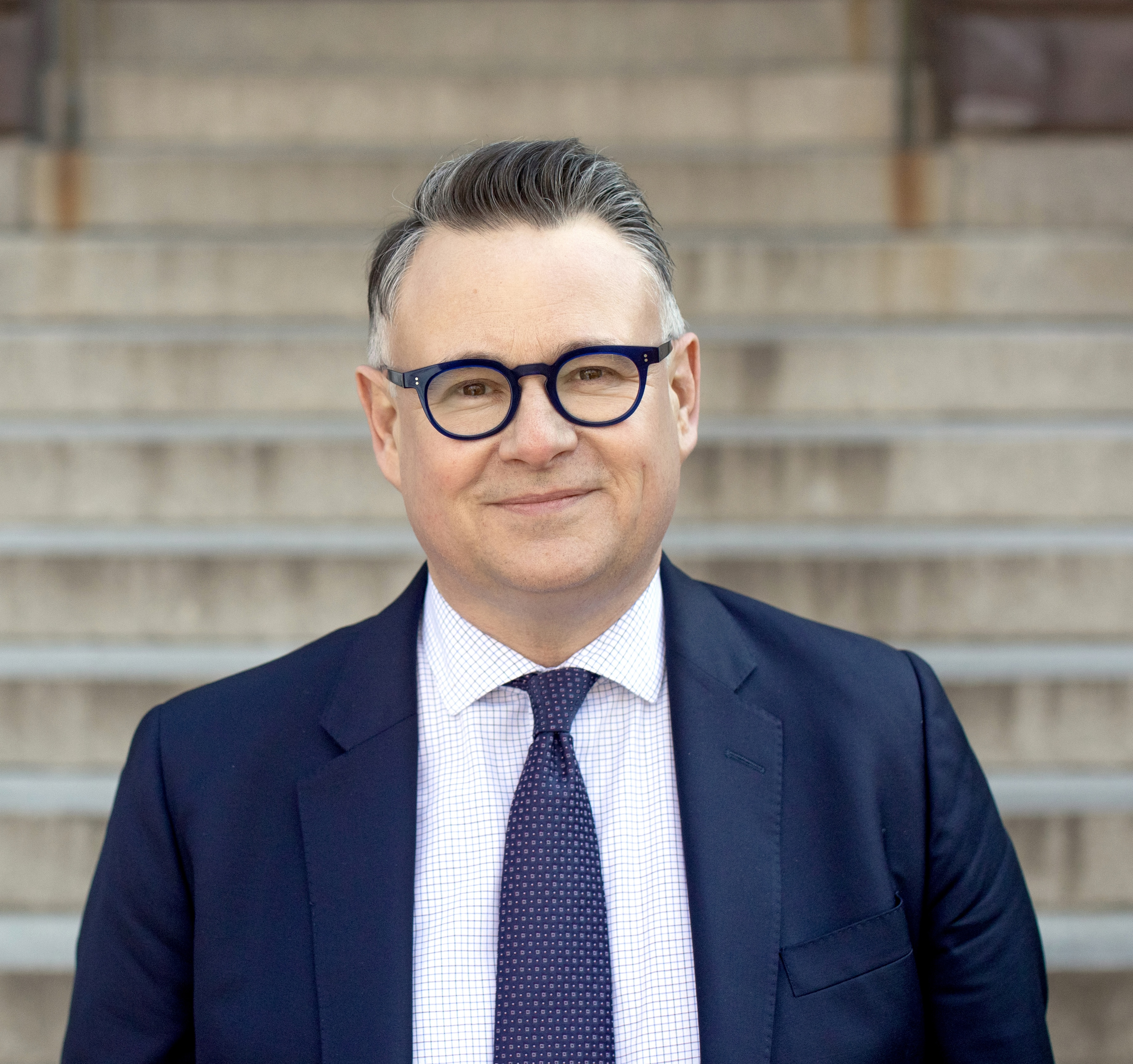
- Born: 1968; 58 years ago Wigan, England
- Education: Cambridge University; Brown University
- Scientific career
- Fields: Physics
- Workplaces: University of Pennsylvania; Syracuse University
- Doctoral advisor: Robert Brandenberger

Mark Trodden (born 1968) is an English theoretical cosmologist and particle physicist. He is Thomas S. Gates, Jr. Professor of Physics & Astronomy and began his tenure as Dean of the School of Arts & Sciences at the University of Pennsylvania in June 2025. A faculty member since 2009, Trodden previously co-directed the Center for Particle Cosmology, chaired the Department of Physics and Astronomy from 2014 to 2022, and served as associate dean for the Natural Sciences from 2023 to 2025.

== Education and career ==
Trodden received both his Bachelor (mathematics) degree and a Certificate of Advanced Study in Mathematics (Part III) from Cambridge University. He subsequently spent a year doing research and supervising undergraduates at Cambridge University. In 1992, Trodden moved to the United States to enter the Ph.D. program at Brown University and obtained his Ph.D. degree in 1995. He worked as a research associate for two years at MIT and two years at Case Western Reserve University after getting his Ph.D. From 2000 to 2009, Trodden was a faculty member at Syracuse University, holding the Alumni Professorship from 2005 to 2009.

== Research ==
Mark Trodden's main research areas are the cosmological implications of Quantum Field Theories, General Relativity, and Superstring Theories. Trodden, with Sean Carroll, introduced a new class of topological defects in ordinary field theories. Trodden's work in theoretical studies and understanding of the early universe has been widely cited and relied upon by the scientific community.

Specifically, Trodden's research focuses on configurations consisting of topological solitons which end on others of equal or higher dimension. In such models, the higher-dimensional defect provides Dirichlet boundary conditions for the lower dimensional one.

Trodden, with his co-workers Anne-Christine Davis and Steven Davis, has also investigated the particle physics and cosmological properties of topological defects in supersymmetic theories. Their first study, dealing with abelian theories demonstrated that all spontaneously broken abelian supersymmetric theories admit cosmic string solutions which are superconducting due to fermion zero modes. Further, by using supersymmetry transformations, they showed how to calculate the supercurrents in terms of the background string fields. They also managed to extend these results to non-abelian theories and investigated the effects of soft supersymmetry breaking.

Trodden describes himself as a "particle cosmologist."

== Academic papers ==
- Carroll, Sean M.; Duvvuri, Vikram; Trodden, Mark; Turner, Michael S. (23 August 2004). "Is cosmic speed-up due to new gravitational physics?". Physical Review D. 70 (4) 043528. American Physical Society (APS). arXiv:astro-ph/0306438v2. Bibcode:2004PhRvD..70d3528C. doi:10.1103/physrevd.70.043528. ISSN 1550-7998. S2CID 44213401.
- Carroll, Sean M.; Hoffman, Mark; Trodden, Mark (10 July 2003). "Can the dark energy equation-of-state parameterw be less than −1?". Physical Review D. 68 (2) 023509. American Physical Society (APS). arXiv:astro-ph/0301273v2. Bibcode:2003PhRvD..68b3509C. doi:10.1103/physrevd.68.023509. ISSN 0556-2821. S2CID 118956653.
- Melchiorri, Alessandro; Mersini, Laura; Ödman, Carolina J.; Trodden, Mark (12 August 2003). "The state of the dark energy equation of state". Physical Review D. 68 (4) 043509. American Physical Society (APS). arXiv:astro-ph/0211522v3. Bibcode:2003PhRvD..68d3509M. doi:10.1103/physrevd.68.043509. ISSN 0556-2821. S2CID 119460205.

== See also ==
- List of theoretical physicists
