= Yun Wang =

Chinese writer (born 1964)

Yun Wang (born 1964) is a poet and cosmologist. She is originally from Gaoping, a small town near Zunyi, in Guizhou Province, China.

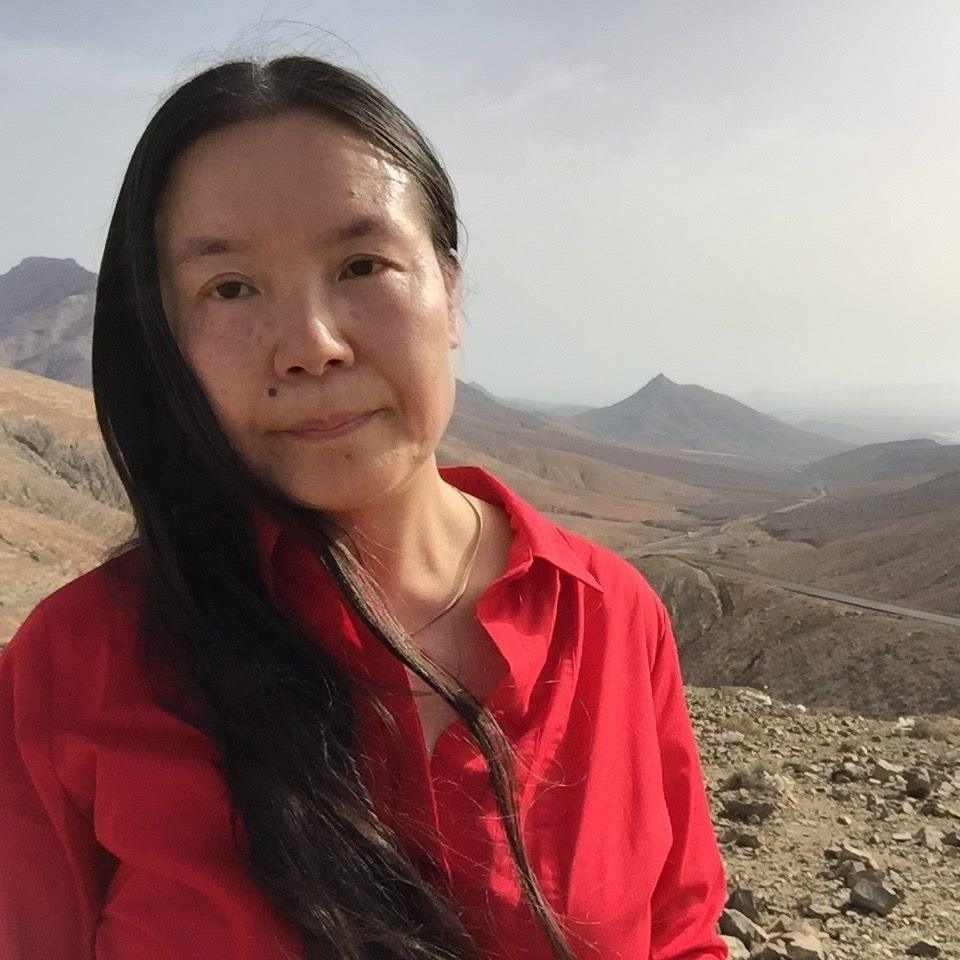
Poet and cosmologist Yun Wang.

== Professional work in astrophysics ==
Yun Wang received a bachelor's degree in physics from Tsinghua University in Beijing, after which she came to the United States and obtained her master's and doctorate (also in physics) from Carnegie Mellon University. A senior research scientist at California Institute of Technology since 2015, and a professor in the University of Oklahoma's department of physics and astronomy until 2017, she has published over 100 refereed papers, with research focusing on probing the dark energy in the universe, with particular attention to the use of supernovae and galaxy redshift surveys as cosmological probes, the cosmic microwave background anisotropy, and measures of cosmological parameters.

Yun Wang has developed strategies for optimizing future surveys to probe dark energy, and created a mission concept for the NASA-DOE Joint Dark Energy Mission (JDEM), the Joint Efficient Dark-energy Investigation (JEDI), and served as the principal investigator of JEDI. The JEDI/JDEM mission concept combined multiple observational methods, including galaxy clustering, weak lensing, and supernovae, to study dark energy. JEDI has significantly impacted the design of space missions to probe dark energy.

Yun Wang was elected a Fellow of the American Physical Society in 2012, with the citation: "For her leadership in dark energy research, especially in developing a robust and consistent framework for analysing and interpreting cosmological data to place model-independent constraints on dark energy, and in optimizing the science return of planned space missions to probe dark energy" (from http://www.aps.org/programs/honors/fellowships/archive-all.cfm?initial=W&year=2012&unit_id=DAP&institution=)

Yun Wang is a Founder of ESA's Euclid Mission, which was launched on July 1, 2023. She has co-led one of the two major science working groups for the Euclid Consortium, the Euclid Galaxy Clustering Science Working Group. Wang has led galaxy clustering science for NASA's Nancy Grace Roman Space Telescope, launched on August 30, 2026. Roman is highly synergistic with Euclid in illuminating the mystery of the dark Universe, see https://www.jpl.nasa.gov/news/nasas-roman-and-esas-euclid-will-team-up-to-investigate-dark-energy.

Yun Wang is the PI of ATLAS Probe, a mission concept for a NASA probe-class space mission. ATLAS Probe will map the cosmic web of dark matter, and decode the physics of galaxy evolution. It will also provide definitive measurements on dark energy, explore dusty regions of the Inner Milky Way, and probe the formation history of the Outer Solar System. Yun Wang was also the PI of the space mission ISCEA (Infrared SmallSat for Cluster Evolution Astrophysics), selected by NASA in September 2018 for a mission concept study. Yun Wang is the PI of SIRMOS (Satellite for InfraRed Multi-Object Spectroscopy), a NASA MIDEX mission concept under development, which will accomplish most of the ATLAS Probe science on a shorter timescale, and address major questions in cosmology formulated by the Astro2020 Decadal Survey.

Her technical monograph "Dark Energy" (ISBN 978-3-527-40941-9) was published by Wiley in 2010.

Her work on dark energy and cosmological constraints has been widely cited in the field (with citations from INSPIRE-HEP):

- Wang, Yun; Mukherjee, P (October 2006). "Robust Dark Energy Constraints from Supernovae, Galaxy Clustering, and Three-Year Wilkinson Microwave Anisotropy Probe Observations". Astrophysical Journal. 650 (1): 1–6. arXiv:astro-ph/0604051. Bibcode:2006ApJ...650....1W. doi:10.1086/507091. S2CID 847741. (Times Cited: 337)
- Chuang, Chia-Hsun; Wang, Yun (October 2013). "Modelling the anisotropic two-point galaxy correlation function on small scales and single-probe measurements of H(z), DA(z) and f(z)σ8(z) from the Sloan Digital Sky Survey DR7 luminous red galaxies". Monthly Notices of the Royal Astronomical Society. 435 (1): 255–262. arXiv:1209.0210. Bibcode:2013MNRAS.435..255C. doi:10.1093/mnras/stt1290. S2CID 119277476. (Times Cited: 306)
- Wang, Yun; Mukherjee, P (Nov 2007). "Observational constraints on dark energy and cosmic curvature". Physical Review. D76 (10): 103533–63. arXiv:astro-ph/0703780. Bibcode:2007PhRvD..76j3533W. doi:10.1103/PhysRevD.76.103533. S2CID 119093990. (Times Cited: 302)
- Wang, Yun; Tegmark, M (June 2004). "New dark energy constraints from supernovae, microwave background, and galaxy clustering". Physical Review Letters. 92 (24) 241302. arXiv:astro-ph/0403292. Bibcode:2004PhRvL..92x1302W. doi:10.1103/PhysRevLett.92.241302. PMID 15245074. S2CID 22090047. (Times Cited: 285)
- Wang, Yun; Mukherjee, P (May 2004). "Model-independent constraints on dark energy density from flux-averaging analysis of type Ia supernova data". Astrophysical Journal. 606 (2): 654–63. arXiv:astro-ph/0312192. Bibcode:2004ApJ...606..654W. doi:10.1086/383196. S2CID 119387792. (Times Cited: 207)
- Wang, Yun; Tegmark, M (May 2005). "Uncorrelated Measurements of the Cosmic Expansion History and Dark Energy from Supernovae". Physical Review. D71 (10): 103513–63. arXiv:astro-ph/0501351. Bibcode:2005PhRvD..71j3513W. doi:10.1103/PhysRevD.71.103513. S2CID 15503044. (Times Cited:205)

== Poetry ==
=== Poetry Books ===
- Dao De Jing by Laozi (Translated by Li-Young Lee & Yun Wang, Chinese/English bilingual, ISBN 978-1-324-07916-3), W. W. Norton & Company, October 2024
- The Book of Mirrors (ISBN 1-945680-47-4), Winner of the Twenty-Sixth White Pine Press Poetry Prize, White Pine Press, 2021
- Dreaming of Fallen Blossoms: Tune Poems of Su Dong-Po (ISBN 1-945680-27-X, Translations, Chinese/English bilingual), White Pine Press, 2019
- The Book of Totality (ISBN 978-1-910669-13-6), Salmon Poetry Press, 2015
- The Book of Jade (ISBN 1-58654-023-8), Winner of the Fifteenth Nicklas Roerich Poetry Prize, Story Line Press, 2002

=== Poetry Chapbooks ===
- Horse by the Mountain Stream (ISBN 0975465309), Word Palace Press, 2016.
- The Carp, Bull Thistle Press, 1994
