= Yuri Golfand =

- Ю́рий Го́льфанд
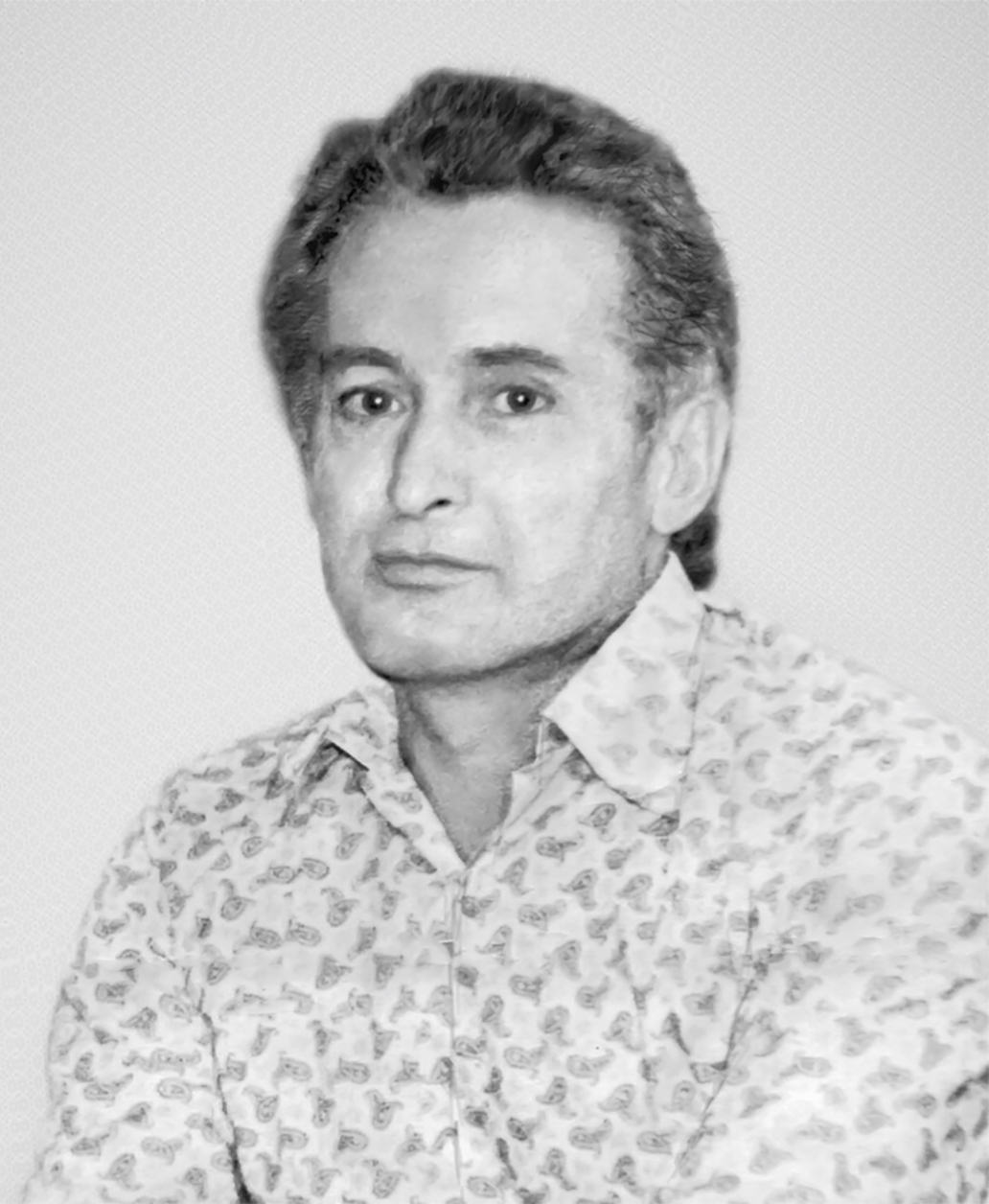
- Born: January 10, 1922; Kharkov, Ukrainian Soviet Socialist Republic
- Died: February 17, 1994 (aged 72); Jerusalem, Israel
- Education: Leningrad State University
- Known for: Discovery of supersymmetry in four-dimensional quantum field theory
- Awards: I.E. Tamm Prize of the Academy of Sciences of the USSR (1989)
- Scientific career
- Fields: Theoretical high-energy physics
- Workplaces: Lebedev Physics Institute; Technion, Haifa, Israel
- Doctoral students: Evgeny Likhtman

Yuri Abramovich Golfand (Hebrew: יורי גולפנד, Russian: Ю́рий Абра́мович Го́льфанд; January 10, 1922 – February 17, 1994) was a Soviet and Israeli physicist known, in particular, for his 1971 paper (joint with his student Evgeny Likhtman) where they proposed supersymmetry between bosonic and fermionic particles by extending the Poincaré algebra with anticommuting spinor generators. The algebra they constructed is also called a super-Poincaré algebra. In the very same paper they presented the first four-dimensional supersymmetric gauge field theory – supersymmetric quantum electrodynamics with the mass term of the photon/photino fields, plus two chiral matter supermultiplets (for a more detailed version see the Tamm Memorial Volume cited below; English translation is presented in Shifman 2000.).

Yuri Golfand received Ph.D. in mathematics (1947) from Leningrad State University; from 1951 till 1973 and in 1980 – 1990 in Lebedev Physics Institute in Moscow.

Yuri Golfand was also a Refusenik. He was fired from his work at the Lebedev Physics Institute in 1973, two years after publishing his work on supersymmetry. After 18 years of waiting, he obtained permission to leave the Soviet Union and emigrated to Israel in 1990, where he worked at the Technion in Haifa and died in 1994.

For a comprehensive biography see B. Eskin's essay in the book "Physics in a Mad World" cited below.
