= Robert Brandenberger =

Swiss physicist (b. 1956)

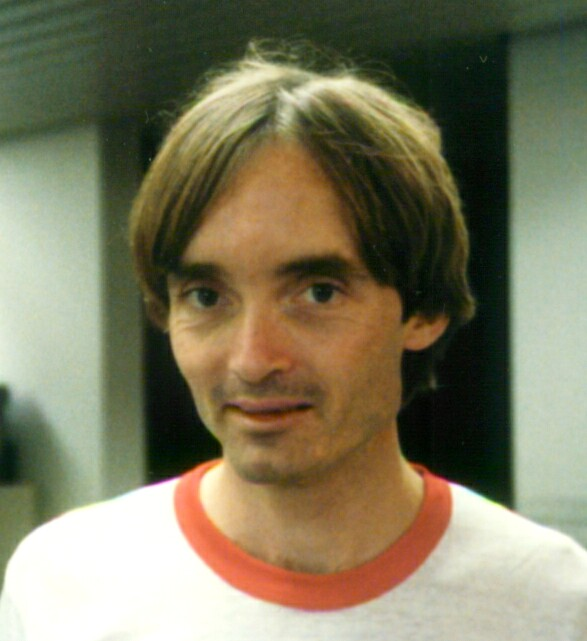
- Brandenberger in 1987
- Born: 1956 (age 69–70); Bern, Switzerland
- Education: ETH Zurich; Harvard University; Cambridge University
- Known for: Brandenberger–Vafa mechanism
- Awards: CAP-CRM Prize in Theoretical and Mathematical Physics
- Scientific career
- Fields: Cosmology
- Workplaces: Brown University; McGill University
- Thesis: Topics in Quantum Field Theory and Cosmology (1983)
- Doctoral advisor: William Henry Press; Arthur Jaffe
- Doctoral students: Hume Feldman; Mark Trodden
- Website: https://www.physics.mcgill.ca/~rhb/

Robert H. Brandenberger (born 1956) is a Swiss-Canadian theoretical cosmologist and a professor of physics at McGill University in Montreal, Quebec, Canada.

== Biography ==
Brandenberger completed his undergraduate degree at ETH Zurich, in Switzerland, and went on to receive his Ph.D. from Harvard University. He was a postdoctoral student under Stephen Hawking at the Department of Applied Mathematics and Theoretical Physics (DAMTP) at the University of Cambridge. He also did postdoctoral work at the Institute for Theoretical Physics, University of California, Santa Barbara. Professor Brandenberger joined the faculty of Brown University in 1987 and then in 2004, he joined McGill University where he is a Canada Research Chair (Tier 1) holder. He is also an affiliate member of the Perimeter Institute for Theoretical Physics.

With Cumrun Vafa, Brandenberger developed string gas cosmology. In particular, they proposed the Brandenberger–Vafa mechanism as an alternative to inflationary cosmology. Because the original model did not address the questions of entropy and flatness, Brandenberger and his colleagues have been working on improving it. During the 2000s, when the Wilkinson Microwave Anisotropy Probe (WMAP) was in operation observing the cosmic microwave background, a number of theorists, including Hawking and Alan Guth, the founder of the theory of cosmic inflation, explored the implications of p-branes, which are hypothetical objects in string theory, for cosmology. With Natalia Shuhmaher, Brandenberger constructed a model of a brane gas to explain why the observed universe has only three dimensions.

== Honors and awards ==
He has won numerous awards for his work, including the Alfred P. Sloan Research Fellowship in 1988, the Outstanding Junior Researcher award from the Department of Energy in 1988, the Killam Research Fellowship in 2009, and the CAP-CRM Prize in Theoretical and Mathematical Physics in 2011.

He was elected a Fellow of the American Physical Society in 2001
