= Yoel Rephaeli =

Israeli-American cosmologist

Yoel Rephaeli (Hebrew: יואל רפאלי) is an Israeli-American cosmologist. He is a Professor of Physics at Tel Aviv University, Israel. Rephaeli studies the Sunyaev-Zel'dovich effect and the astrophysics of galaxy clusters.
