= Orfeu Bertolami =

Brazilian physicist

Orfeu Bertolami (São Paulo, Brazil, 1959) is a theoretical physicist who works in problems of astrophysics, cosmology, general relativity and quantum gravity. He worked at Instituto Superior Técnico in Lisbon, Portugal from 1991 to 2010. He is currently professor at Departamento de Física e Astronomia of the Faculdade de Ciências da Universidade do Porto.

He is the author of a book to raise the awareness of the public on science about the history of ideas in astronomy, cosmology and theories of gravity (in Portuguese) and of a technical text on the aspects of gravity and propulsion in space published by the European Space Agency:

- O Livro das Escolhas Cósmicas, Editora Gradiva 2006
- Gravity Control and Possible Influence on Space Propulsion: A Scientific Study, European Space Agency 2002

In particular, Bertolami studied baryogengesis, the cosmological constant problem and its connection with the equivalence principle, the generalized Chaplygin gas model of unification of Dark Energy (to explain the cosmic acceleration) and Dark Matter (to explain the flattening of the rotation curves of galaxies) and some Modified models of gravity with non-minimal coupling between curvature and matter. He has also worked on the Pioneer Anomaly, which was shown to be most likely due to on-board thermal effects and reflection of the generated radiation. Most recent work concerns extensions of quantum mechanics based on phase-space noncommutativity.
