= Ytterbium-doped lutetium orthovanadate =

Active laser medium

Ytterbium-doped lutetium orthovanadate, typically abbreviated Yb:LuVO_{4}, is an active laser medium. The peak absorption cross section for the pi-polarization is 8.42×10^{−20} cm^{2} at 985 nm, and the stimulated emission cross section at 1020 nm is 1.03×10^{−20} cm².

== See also ==
- List of laser types
