= Peter Coles =

British astrophysicist

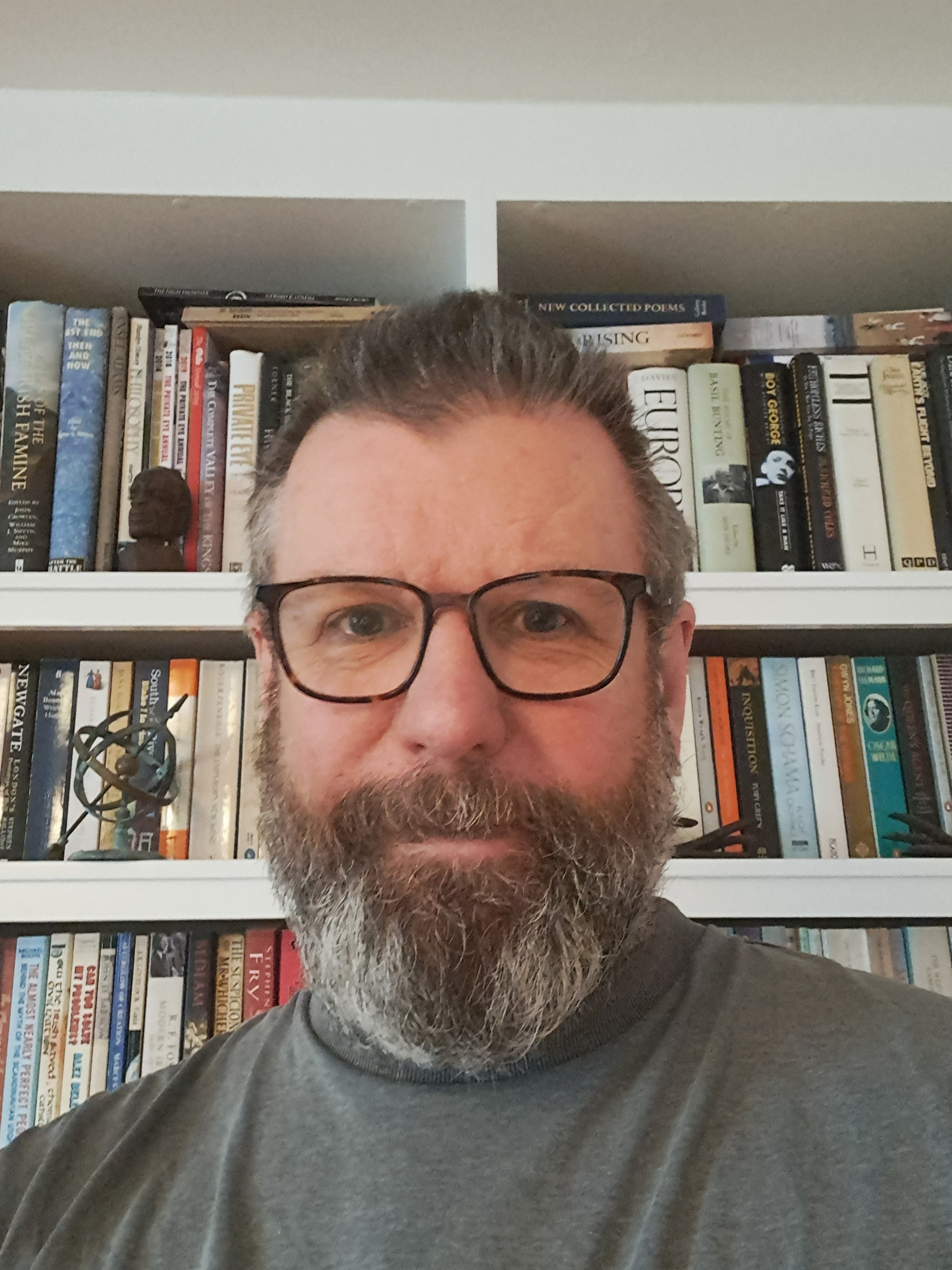
- Born: 4 June 1963
- Education: University of Sussex
- Occupation: Astrophysicist
- Employers: Cardiff University (2007–2013); Maynooth University (2017–); Queen Mary University of London (1990–1999); University of Nottingham (1999–2007); University of Sussex (2013–)
- Scientific career
- Fields: Cosmology
- Workplaces: Queen Mary University of London (1990–1999); University of Sussex (2013–); University of Nottingham (1999–2007); Cardiff University (2007–2013); Maynooth University (2017–)
- Doctoral advisor: John D. Barrow
- Website: telescoper.wordpress.com

Peter Coles (born 1963) is an English theoretical cosmologist at Maynooth University. He studies the large scale structure of the Universe.

He studied for his PhD from 1985 to 1988, subsequently becoming a postdoctoral researcher at Sussex and Queen Mary, subsequently becoming a lecturer there. He was a professor at Cardiff University starting in 2007, and from 2013 he was the head of the School of Mathematical and Physical Sciences at the University of Sussex. In 2017, he started working at Maynooth University, becoming head of the Department of Theoretical Physics in 2019.

== Early life and education ==
He was born in Newcastle upon Tyne and educated at the Royal Grammar School, Newcastle.

He did his first degree at Magdalene College, Cambridge, in Natural Sciences, specialising in Theoretical Physics. In 1985 he started studying for his doctorate at the University of Sussex, supervised by John D. Barrow, and completed his DPhil thesis in 1988.

Coles advises LGBT scientists not to worry excessively that their sexual orientation will impair their careers.

== Career ==
Coles has been a cosmologist and theoretical astrophysicist since 1985. During 1988 and 1990 he was a postdoctoral researcher at the University of Sussex, before moving to the mathematics department of the Queen Mary & Westfield College, University of London, where he worked from 1990 until 1999, first as a temporary lecturer, then as a PPARC Advanced Fellow from 1993 to 1998, becoming Lecturer-in-waiting in 1994 and Reader-in-waiting in 1997. He then worked at the University of Nottingham between 1999 and 2007 as a professor of astrophysics, where he set up a new group in astronomy.

Coles was a professor of theoretical astrophysics at Cardiff University from 2007 to 2013, and was the deputy head of the school of physics and astronomy.

In February 2013 he became the head of the school of mathematical and physical sciences at the University of Sussex. He left the University of Sussex in 2016 to return to Cardiff to hold a joint position with the school of physics and astronomy and the Data Innovation Research Institute. On 1 December 2017 he started working part-time at both Maynooth University and Cardiff, moving full-time to Maynooth in July 2018. He became head of the Department of Theoretical Physics on 1 September 2019. He edits the Open Journal of Astrophysics.

He was a Fellow of the Royal Astronomical Society and of the Institute of Physics, but resigned from both in 2024 due to their use of high article processing charges for their gold open access journals. He has served on the Council of the Royal Astronomical Society.

He currently resides in Maynooth. Among the places he has previously lived in are Brighton, Beeston in Nottinghamshire, Bethnal Green in London, and Cardiff.

== Research ==
His primary research interest is in cosmology and the large-scale structure of the Universe, specifically on theoretical models that try to account for the properties of the observable universe, including the cosmic microwave background and galaxy clusters. He also researches cosmological models that feature magnetic fields, Non-Gaussianity and asymmetries, as well as the application of probability and statistics in astronomy and physics.

He has taught undergraduate courses in mathematics, statistics, and astronomy. Along with Francesco Lucchin he wrote a textbook on "Cosmology: the origin and evolution of cosmic structure" (ISBN 978-0-471-48909-2), and a second edition of it was published by John Wiley & Sons in July 2002.

He is the only Irish-based member of the Euclid (spacecraft) collaboration, where he studies the clustering of galaxies.

== Personal life ==
Coles has a blog named In the Dark, where he writes under the name Telescoper (an anagram of his name), covering a range of topics including astronomy, science funding, opera, jazz, rugby and crosswords. In 1999 it was one of "Five great physics blogs" listed by the Daily Telegraph.
