= Dennis W. Sciama =

British physicist (1926–1999)

Dennis Sciama FRS
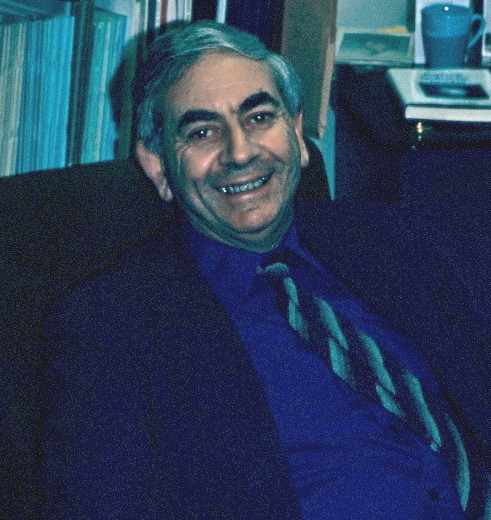
- Sciama in 1981
- Born: Dennis William Siahou Sciama; 18 November 1926; Manchester, Lancashire, England
- Died: 18 December 1999 (aged 73); Oxford, England
- Education: Trinity College, Cambridge
- Known for: Rees–Sciama effect
- Spouse: Lidia Dina (m. 1959)
- Children: 2
- Awards: Faraday Medal (1991); Guthrie Medal and Prize (1991)
- Scientific career
- Fields: Gravitation
- Workplaces: University of Oxford; University of Cambridge; Cornell University; Harvard University; King's College, London; University of Texas at Austin; Scuola Internazionale Superiore di Studi Avanzati; Scuola Normale Superiore
- Thesis: On the origin of inertia (1952)
- Doctoral advisor: Paul Dirac
- Doctoral students: John D. Barrow; James Binney; Philip Candelas; Brandon Carter; David Deutsch; George Ellis; Gary Gibbons; Stephen Hawking; Adrian Melott; Martin Rees; Antony Valentini; Tim Palmer

Dennis William Siahou Sciama, FRS (/ʃiˈæmə/; 18 November 1926 – 18 December 1999) was an English physicist who, through his own work and that of his students, played a major role in developing British physics after the Second World War. He was the PhD supervisor to many famous physicists and astrophysicists, including John D. Barrow, David Deutsch, George F. R. Ellis, Stephen Hawking, Adrian Melott and Martin Rees, among others; he is considered one of the fathers of modern cosmology.

== Education and early life ==
Sciama was born in Manchester, England, the son of Nelly Ades and Abraham Sciama. The family surname Sciama is a variant transliteration of Shammah (Hebrew: שמאע; Arabic: شماع), also spelled Chammah.

He was of Syrian-Jewish ancestry — his father born in Manchester and his mother born in Egypt, but both traced their roots back to Aleppo, Syria.

Sciama earned his PhD in 1953 at the University of Cambridge supervised by Paul Dirac, with a dissertation on Mach's principle and inertia. His work later influenced the formulation of scalar-tensor theories of gravity.

== Career and research ==
Sciama taught at Cornell University, King's College London, Harvard University and the University of Texas at Austin, but spent most of his career at the University of Cambridge (1950s and 1960s) and the University of Oxford as a Senior Research Fellow in All Souls College, Oxford (1970s and early 1980s). In 1983, he moved from Oxford to Trieste, becoming Professor of Astrophysics at the International School for Advanced Studies (SISSA), and a consultant with the International Centre for Theoretical Physics. He also taught at the Scuola Normale Superiore of Pisa.

From 1972 to 1973 he was the Donegall Lecturer in Mathematics at Trinity College Dublin.

During the 1990s, he divided his time between Trieste (with a residence in nearby Venice) and his main residence at Oxford, where he was a visiting professor until the end of his life.

Sciama made connections among some topics in astronomy and astrophysics. He wrote on radio astronomy, X-ray astronomy, quasars, the anisotropies of the cosmic microwave radiation, the interstellar and intergalactic medium, astroparticle physics and the nature of dark matter. Most significant was his work in general relativity, with and without quantum theory, and black holes. He helped revitalize the classical relativistic extension to general relativity known as Einstein-Cartan gravity.

Early in his career, he supported Fred Hoyle's steady state cosmology, and interacted with Hoyle, Hermann Bondi, and Thomas Gold. When evidence against the steady state theory, e.g., the cosmic microwave radiation, mounted in the 1960s, Sciama abandoned it and worked on the Big Bang cosmology; he was perhaps the only prominent Steady-State supporter to switch sides (Hoyle continued to work on modifications of steady-state for the rest of his life, while Bondi and Gold moved away from cosmology during the 1960s).

During his last years, Sciama became interested in the issue of dark matter in galaxies. Among other aspects, he pursued a theory of dark matter that consists of a heavy neutrino, certainly disfavored in his realization, but still possible in a more complicated scenario.

=== Doctoral students ===
Several leading astrophysicists and cosmologists of the modern era completed their doctorates under Sciama's supervision, notably:

- George Ellis (1964)
- Stephen Hawking (1966)
- Brandon Carter (1967)
- Martin Rees (1967)
- Gary Gibbons (1973)
- James Binney (1975)
- John D. Barrow (1977)
- Philip Candelas (1977)
- David Deutsch (1978)
- Adrian Melott (1981)
- Antony Valentini (1992)

Sciama also strongly influenced Roger Penrose, who dedicated his The Road to Reality to Sciama's memory. The 1960s group he led in Cambridge (which included Ellis, Hawking, Rees, and Carter), has proved of lasting influence.

=== Publications ===
- Sciama, Dennis (1959). The Unity of the Universe. London: Faber & Faber. Bibcode:1959unun.book.....S.
- Sciama, Dennis (1969). "The Physical Foundations of General Relativity". Science Study Series. 58. New York: Doubleday. Bibcode:1969pfgr.book.....S. Short (104 pages) and clearly written non-mathematical book on the physical and conceptual foundations of General Relativity. It can be read with profit by physics students before immersing themselves in more technical studies of General Relativity.
- Sciama, Dennis (1971). Modern Cosmology. Cambridge University Press. ISBN 9780521080699.
- Sciama, Dennis (1993). Modern Cosmology and the Dark Matter Problem. Cambridge University Press. ISBN 9780521438483.

=== Awards and honours ===
Sciama was elected a Fellow of the Royal Society (FRS) in 1983. He was also an honorary member of the American Academy of Arts and Sciences, the American Philosophical Society and the Academia Lincei of Rome. He served as president of the International Society of General Relativity and Gravitation, 1980–84.

His work at SISSA and the University of Oxford led to the creation of a lecture series in his honour, the Dennis Sciama Memorial Lectures. In 2009, the Institute of Cosmology and Gravitation at the University of Portsmouth elected to name their new building, and their supercomputer in 2011, in his honour.

Sciama has been portrayed in a number of biographical projects about his most famous student, Stephen Hawking. In the 2004 BBC TV movie Hawking, Sciama was played by John Sessions. In the 2014 film The Theory of Everything, Sciama was played by David Thewlis; physicist Adrian Melott strongly criticized the portrayal of Sciama in the film.

== Personal life ==
Sciama was of Jewish-Syrian descent and an avowed atheist. In 1959, Sciama married Lidia Dina, a social anthropologist, who survived him, along with their two daughters.
