= Asantha Cooray =

Asantha R. Cooray
- Education: Massachusetts Institute of Technology (B.S., 1997 Physics) (B.S., 1997 Mathematics) (B.S., 1997 Earth, Atmospheric, and Planetary Sciences) (M.S., 1997 Earth and Planetary Sciences); University of Chicago (M.S., 1998 Astronomy and Astrophysics) (Ph.D, 2001 Astronomy and Astrophysics)
- Awards: UCI Chancellor's Award for Excellence and Distinguished Fostering of Undergraduate Research (2007); NASA Group Achievement Award (2012); NASA Group Achievement Award (2014)
- Scientific career
- Fields: Physics; Astronomy; Cosmology
- Workplaces: University of California, Irvine
- Thesis: Applications of Halo Approach to Non-Linear Large Scale Structure Clustering
- Doctoral advisor: Wayne Hu
- Other academic advisors: James L. Elliot; Bernard F. Burke

Asantha R. Cooray is a professor and a chancellor's fellow at University of California, Irvine, California, US, and a member of the research faculty at the California Institute of Technology. His research expertise is in the field of space science, cosmology, astrophysics and is a member of several space-based and NASA sounding rocket experiments and instrumentation aimed at understanding the early universe, first stars, and galaxies. He is a member of the ESA's Herschel Space Observatory-SPIRE Instrument Team and several NASA astrophysics missions planned for this decade, including the Inflation Probe. He has contributed to topics in field such as halo model of the galaxy distribution in the large-scale structure, and has developed ways to measure and quantify physical properties of dark energy and dark matter in the universe. Cooray is also a science editor of Journal of Cosmology and Astroparticle Physics (JCAP).

== Education ==
Cooray attended Royal College, Colombo, Sri Lanka, for secondary education, Massachusetts Institute of Technology for undergraduate studies in physics and mathematics, and completed a PhD in astrophysics in 2001 at University of Chicago under Wayne Hu.

== Career ==
He was the Sherman Fairchild Senior Research Fellow in theoretical astrophysics at California Institute of Technology between the years 2001 and 2005, funded by the Sherman Fairchild foundation. He was a recipient of an early career-development award (CAREER) from US National Science Foundation in 2007.

== Publications ==
- List of Publications
