= John D. Barrow =

British scientist

John Barrow FRS
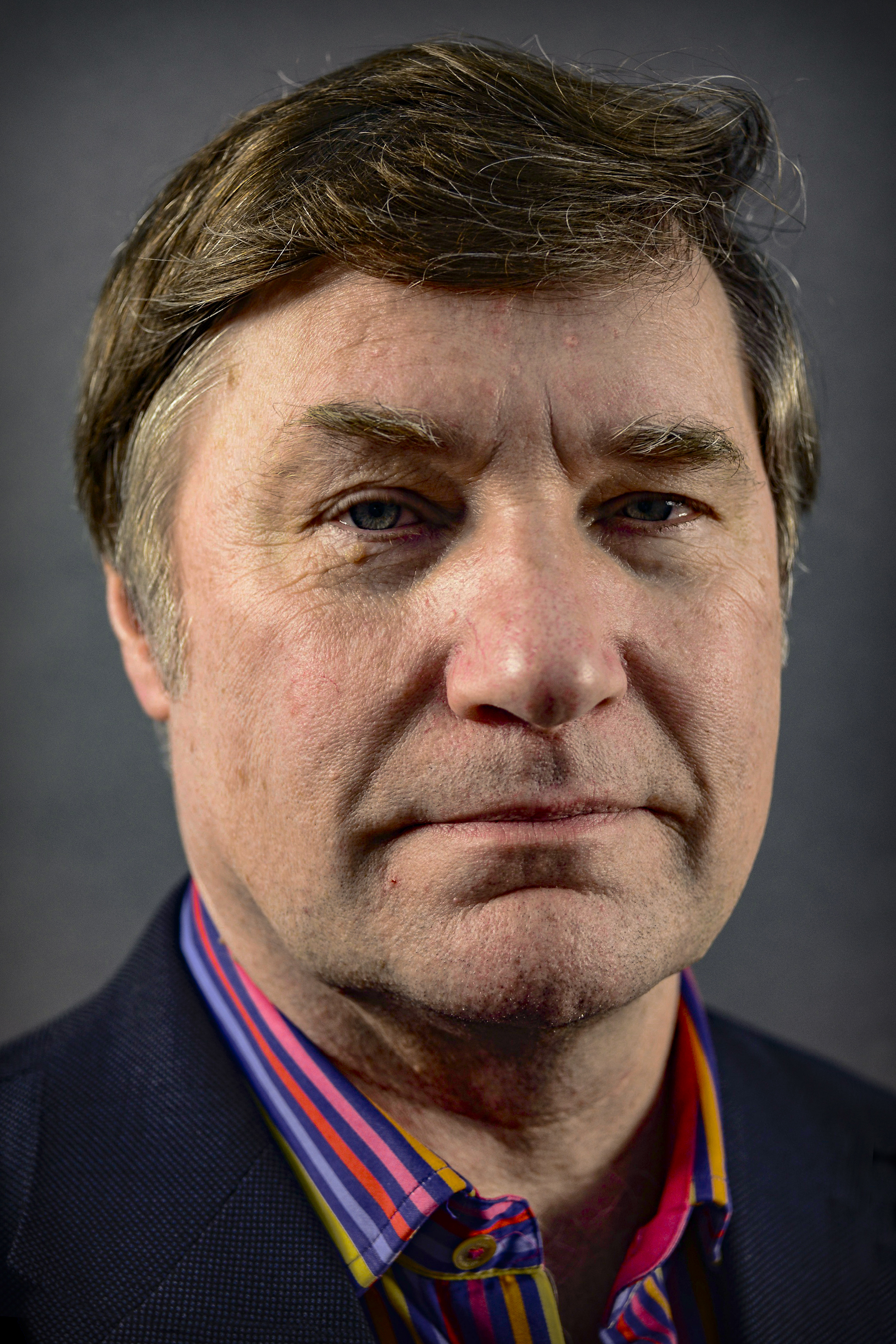
- Barrow in 2012
- Born: 29 November 1952; London, England
- Died: 26 September 2020 (aged 67)
- Education: Van Mildert College, Durham (BSc); Magdalen College, Oxford (DPhil)
- Awards: Italgas Prize (2003); Templeton Prize (2006); Michael Faraday Prize (2008); Kelvin Prize (2009); Christopher Zeeman Medal (2011); IOP Dirac Medal (2015); Gold Medal of the Royal Astronomical Society (2016), Giuseppe Occhialini Medal and Prize (2019)
- Scientific career
- Fields: Physics; Astronomy; Mathematics; Popular science
- Workplaces: University of Cambridge; Gresham College; University of California, Berkeley; University of Oxford; University of Sussex
- Thesis: Non-Uniform Cosmological Models (1977)
- Doctoral advisor: Dennis William Sciama
- Doctoral students: Peter Coles; David Wands

John David Barrow FRS (29 November 1952 – 26 September 2020) was an English cosmologist, theoretical physicist, and mathematician. He served as Gresham professor of geometry at Gresham College from 2008 to 2011. Barrow was also a writer of popular science and an amateur playwright.

== Education ==
Barrow attended Barham Primary School in Wembley until 1964 and Ealing Grammar School for Boys from 1964 to 1971 and obtained his first degree in mathematics and physics from Van Mildert College at the University of Durham in 1974. In 1977, he completed his doctorate in astrophysics at Magdalen College, Oxford, supervised by Dennis William Sciama.

== Career and research ==
Barrow was a Junior Research Lecturer at Christ Church, Oxford, from 1977 to 1981. He completed two postdoctoral years as a Miller Research Fellow in astronomy at the University of California, Berkeley, as a Commonwealth Lindemann Fellow (1977–8) and Miller Fellow (1980–1).

In 1981, he joined the University of Sussex and rose to become Professor and Director of the Astronomy Centre. In 1999, he became Professor in the Department of Applied Mathematics and Theoretical Physics and a fellow in Clare Hall at Cambridge University. From 2003 to 2007 he was Gresham Professor of Astronomy at Gresham College, London, and he was appointed as Gresham Professor of Geometry from 2008 to 2011; only one person has previously held two different Gresham chairs.

From 1999, he directed the Millennium Mathematics Project (MMP) at the University of Cambridge. This is an outreach and education programme to improve the appreciation, teaching and learning of mathematics and its applications. In 2006 it was awarded the Queen's Anniversary Prize for Educational Achievement by Queen Elizabeth II at Buckingham Palace.

In addition to having published more than 500 journal articles, Barrow co-wrote (with Frank J. Tipler) The Anthropic Cosmological Principle, a work on the history of the ideas, specifically intelligent design and teleology, as well as a treatise on astrophysics. He also published 22 books for general readers, beginning with his 1983 The Left Hand of Creation. His books summarise the state of the affairs of physical questions, often in the form of compendia of a large number of facts assembled from the works of great physicists, such as Paul Dirac and Arthur Eddington.

Barrow's approach to philosophical issues posed by physical cosmology made his books accessible to general readers. For example, Barrow introduced a memorable paradox, which he called "the Groucho Marx Effect" (see Russell-like paradoxes). Here, he quotes Groucho Marx: "I wouldn't want to belong to any club that would accept me as a member". Applying this to problems in cosmology, Barrow stated: "A universe simple enough to be understood is too simple to produce a mind capable of understanding it".

Barrow lectured at 10 Downing Street, Windsor Castle, and the Vatican, as well as to the general public. In 2002, his play Infinities premiered in Milan, played in Valencia, and won the Premi Ubu 2002 Italian Theatre Prize.

At the 2006 'Origins of the Universe' conference in Cambridge, organized by Stephen Hawking, Barrow debated the anthropic principle with Martin Rees. The proceedings were later published in Nature.

== Honours ==
Barrow was awarded the 2006 Templeton Prize for "Progress Toward Research or Discoveries about Spiritual Realities" for his "writings about the relationship between life and the universe, and the nature of human understanding [which] have created new perspectives on questions of ultimate concern to science and religion". He was a member of a United Reformed Church, which he described as teaching "a traditional deistic picture of the universe".

In 2008, the Royal Society awarded him the Faraday Prize. He was elected a Fellow of the Royal Society (London) in 2003 and elected Fellow of the Academia Europaea in 2009. He has received Honorary Doctorates from the Universities of Hertfordshire, Sussex, Durham, South Wales, and Szczecin, and was an Honorary Professor at the University of Nanjing. He was an Honorary Fellow of Van Mildert College (Durham University) and of Gresham College (London). He was a Centenary Gifford Lecturer at the University of Glasgow in 1989.

He was awarded the Dirac Prize and Gold Medal of the Institute of Physics in 2015 and the Gold Medal of the Royal Astronomical Society in 2016.

== Barrow scale ==
The Barrow scale proposed by him is a measurement of the technological level and mastery of civilizations based upon the smallest structures that they can manipulate. It is a complement to the Kardashev scale, which is based upon the largest structures that can be manipulated.

Type	Description
I	Manipulation of macroscopic structures, as available to an unaided member of the civilisation.
II	Manipulation of genes and macromolecules
III	Manipulation of molecules and molecular bonds.
IV	Access to nanotechnology and atomically precise manufacturing; manipulation of individual atoms.
V	Access to picotechnology and femtotechnology; manipulation of individual nuclei.
VI	Access to attotechnology and finer; manipulation of elementary particles.
Ω	Omega-minus engineering; manipulation of the basic structure of space and time.

== Death ==
Barrow died on 26 September 2020 from colon cancer, at the age of 67.

== Publications ==
In English:

- The Left Hand of Creation: The Origin and Evolution of the Expanding Universe, Barrow J., and Joseph Silk, Oxford UP, 1983
- Between Inner Space and Outer Space: Essays on the Science, Art, and Philosophy of the Origin of the Universe
- Impossibility: Limits of Science and the Science of Limits. ISBN 0-09-977211-6
- Material Content of the Universe
- Pi in the Sky: Counting, Thinking, and Being. Oxford University Press, 1992, ISBN 9780198539568
- Science and Ultimate Reality: Quantum Theory, Cosmology and Complexity
- Barrow, John D.; Tipler, Frank J. (1986). The Anthropic Cosmological Principle (1st ed.). Oxford University Press. ISBN 978-0-19-282147-8. LCCN 87028148.
- The Artful Universe: The Cosmic Source of Human Creativity. OUP, 1995, ISBN 978-0198539964. Expanded 2005, ISBN 019280569X
- The Book of Nothing: Vacuums, Voids, and the Latest Ideas about the Origins of the Universe, Pantheon, 2001, ISBN 0375420991
- The Infinite Book: A Short Guide to the Boundless, Timeless and Endless, Pantheon Books, New York, 2005, ISBN 0375422277
- The Origin of the Universe: To the Edge of Space and Time
- The Universe That Discovered Itself
- The Artful Universe Expanded 2005.
- The World Within the World
- Theories of Everything: The Quest for Ultimate Explanation
- The Constants of Nature: The Numbers that Encode the Deepest Secrets of the Universe. 2003, ISBN 0375422218
- New Theories of Everything, 2007. Pantheon, ISBN 978-0192807212
- Cosmic Imagery: Key Images in the History of Science. The Bodley Head, 2008, ISBN 978-0224075237
- 100 Essential Things You Didn't Know You Didn't Know: Math Explains Your World. W. W. Norton, 2008, ISBN 0393070077
- The Book of Universes: Exploring the Limits of the Cosmos. W. W. Norton, 2011, ISBN 0393081214
- Mathletics: A Scientist Explains 100 Amazing Things About The World of Sports. W. W. Norton, 2012, ISBN 978-0393063417
- 100 Essential Things You Didn't Know You Didn't Know About Maths and the Arts. Bodley Head, 2014, ISBN 978-1847922311

In other languages:

- All Barrow's books for general readers have been re-published in Italy.

As editor:

- Water and Life: The Unique Properties of H_{2}O. (ed., with Ruth M. Lynden-Bell, Simon Conway Morris, John L. Finney, Charles Harper, Jr.) CRC Press, 2010. ISBN 1-4398-0356-0
- Fitness of the Cosmos for Life: Biochemistry and Fine-Tuning. (eds., with S. Conway Morris, S.J. Freeland, and C.L. Harper), Cambridge UP, 2007. ISBN 978-1-10740655-1
- Science and Ultimate Reality: Quantum Theory, Cosmology and Complexity, 90th Birthday Volume for John Archibald Wheeler, (ed., with P.C.W. Davies, & C. Harper), Cambridge UP, 2004. ISBN 0-521-83113-X
- The Physical Universe: The Interface Between Cosmology, Astrophysics and Particle Physics, (ed., with A Henriques, M Lago, Malcolm Longair), Springer-Verlag, 1991. ISBN 978-3540542933
