= Gaoping, Guizhou =

Town in china

Gaoping (高坪) is a small town in the mountains near Zunyi, in Guizhou (Guizhou) province, People's Republic of China.

It is near the Moutai brewery, where Maotai rice liquor is brewed.

Lai fun, a variety of rice noodle is made locally.

The rice liquor Dongjiu is brewed nearby.
