= Andrew R. Liddle =

Scottish astronomer

- Born: 9 June 1965 (age 61); Glasgow, Scotland
- Education: University of Glasgow
- Scientific career
- Fields: Astrophysics
- Workplaces: Royal Observatory Edinburgh; University of Edinburgh; Sussex University; Imperial College, London
- Doctoral advisor: R. Gordon Moorhouse

Andrew R. Liddle FRSE (born 9 June 1965) is a professor of astrophysics at the University of Lisbon. From 2018 to 2020 he was a visiting fellow at the University of Waterloo. From 2013 to 2017 he was professor of astrophysics at the Royal Observatory Edinburgh. Publications include books and over 260 papers. He is a theoretical cosmologist and is interested in understanding the properties of the Universe and how these relate to fundamental physical laws.

== Research ==
Liddle's research is on various aspects of cosmology and astrophysics, and in particular he is interested in the origin and evolution of structure in the Universe, with special focus on models and observational constraints on the inflationary cosmology, physics of the cosmic microwave background and the use of galaxy clusters as cosmological probes.

His areas of research include:

- The origin and evolution of structure in the Universe
- Models of and observational constraints on the inflationary cosmology
- Physics of the cosmic microwave background
- Dark energy in the Universe.

He is involved in several international projects, including the Planck satellite, the Dark Energy Survey and the XMM Cluster Survey.

Before his position at the Royal Observatory Edinburgh he was a professor of cosmology at University of Sussex in Brighton.

== Publications ==
- An Introduction to Modern Cosmology, 2nd edition ISBN 0-470-84835-9 (pbk), 0-470-84834-0 (hbk),
- An introdution to Modern Cosmology, 4th edtion (with Marina. V. Cortes, 2026), ISBN 978-1-394-27843-5
- Cosmological Inflation and Large Scale Structure, ISBN 0-521-57598-2 (pbk), 0-521-66022-X (hbk),
- The Oxford Companion to Cosmology, ISBN 978-0-19-956084-4 (pbk),
- The Primordial Density Perturbation, ISBN 978-0-521-82849-9 (pbk), 978-0-521-82849-9 (hbk),
- Bayesian Methods in Cosmology, ISBN 9780521887946 (hbk).

== Awards and honors ==
In 2015, Liddle was elected a Fellow of the Royal Society of Edinburgh.
