= Ladder paradox =

Thought experiment in special relativity

The ladder paradox (or barn-pole paradox) is a thought experiment in special relativity. It involves a ladder, parallel to the ground, travelling horizontally at relativistic speed (near the speed of light) and therefore undergoing a Lorentz length contraction. The ladder is imagined passing through the open front and rear doors of a garage or barn which is shorter than its rest length, so if the ladder was not moving it would not be able to fit inside. To a stationary observer, due to the contraction, the moving ladder is able to fit entirely inside the building as it passes through. On the other hand, from the point of view of an observer moving with the ladder, the ladder will not be contracted, and it is the building which will be Lorentz contracted to an even smaller length. Therefore, the ladder will not be able to fit inside the building as it passes through. This poses an apparent discrepancy between the realities of both observers.

This apparent paradox results from the mistaken assumption of absolute simultaneity. The ladder is said to fit into the garage if both of its ends can be made to be simultaneously inside the garage. The paradox is resolved when it is considered that in relativity, simultaneity is relative to each observer, making the answer to whether the ladder fits inside the garage also relative to each of them.

== Paradox ==
The simplest version of the problem involves a garage, with a front and back door which are open, and a ladder which, when at rest with respect to the garage, is too long to fit inside. We now move the ladder at a high horizontal velocity through the stationary garage. Because of its high velocity, the ladder undergoes the relativistic effect of length contraction, and becomes significantly shorter. As a result, as the ladder passes through the garage, it is, for a time, completely contained inside it. We could, if we liked, simultaneously close both doors for a brief time, to demonstrate that the ladder fits.

So far, this is consistent. The apparent paradox comes when we consider the symmetry of the situation. As an observer moving with the ladder is travelling at constant velocity in the inertial reference frame of the garage, this observer also occupies an inertial frame, where, by the principle of relativity, the same laws of physics apply. From this perspective, it is the ladder which is now stationary, and the garage which is moving with high velocity. It is therefore the garage which is length contracted, and we now conclude that it is far too small to have ever fully contained the ladder as it passed through: the ladder does not fit, and we cannot close both doors on either side of the ladder without hitting it. This apparent contradiction is the paradox.

Figure 1: An overview of the garage and the ladder at rest

Figure 2: In the garage frame, the ladder undergoes length contraction and will therefore fit into the garage.

Figure 3: In the ladder frame, the garage undergoes length contraction and is too small to contain the ladder.

== Resolution ==
Figure 4: Scenario in the garage frame: a length contracted ladder passing through the garage

Figure 5: Scenario in the ladder frame: a length contracted garage passing over the ladder. Only one door is closed at any time

The solution to the apparent paradox lies in the relativity of simultaneity: what one observer (e.g. with the garage) considers to be two simultaneous events may not in fact be simultaneous to another observer (e.g. with the ladder). When we say the ladder "fits" inside the garage, what we mean precisely is that, at some specific time, the position of the back of the ladder and the position of the front of the ladder were both inside the garage; in other words, the front and back of the ladder were inside the garage simultaneously. As simultaneity is relative, then, two observers disagree on whether the ladder fits. To the observer with the garage, the back end of the ladder was in the garage at the same time that the front end of the ladder was, and so the ladder fit; but to the observer with the ladder, these two events were not simultaneous, and the ladder did not fit.

A clear way of seeing this is to consider the doors, which, in the frame of the garage, close for the brief period that the ladder is fully inside. We now look at these events in the frame of the ladder. The first event is the front of the ladder approaching the exit door of the garage. The door closes, and then opens again to let the front of the ladder pass through. At a later time, the back of the ladder passes through the entrance door, which closes and then opens. We see that, as simultaneity is relative, the two doors did not need to be shut at the same time, and the ladder did not need to fit inside the garage.

The situation can be further illustrated by the Minkowski diagram below. The diagram is in the rest frame of the garage. The vertical light-blue band shows the garage in spacetime, and the light-red band shows the ladder in spacetime. The x and t axes are the garage space and time axes, respectively, and x′ and t′ are the ladder space and time axes, respectively.

In the frame of the garage, the ladder at any specific time is represented by a horizontal set of points, parallel to the x axis, in the red band. One example is the bold blue line segment, which lies inside the blue band representing the garage, and which represents the ladder at a time when it is fully inside the garage. In the frame of the ladder, however, sets of simultaneous events lie on lines parallel to the x′ axis; the ladder at any specific time is therefore represented by a cross section of such a line with the red band. One such example is the bold red line segment. We see that such line segments never lie fully inside the blue band; that is, the ladder never lies fully inside the garage.

Figure 6: A Minkowski diagram of the ladder paradox. The garage is shown in light blue, the ladder in light red. The diagram is in the rest frame of the garage, with x and t being the garage space and time axes, respectively. The ladder frame is for a person sitting on the front of the ladder, with x′ and t′ being the ladder space and time axes respectively. The blue and red lines, AB and AC, depict the ladder at the time when its front end meets the garage's exit door, in the frame of reference of the garage and the ladder, respectively. Event D is the rear end of the ladder reaching the garage's entrance.

== Shutting the ladder in the garage ==
Figure 7: A ladder contracting under acceleration to fit into a length contracted garage

In a more complicated version of the paradox, we can physically trap the ladder once it is fully inside the garage. This could be done, for instance, by not opening the exit door again after we close it. In the frame of the garage, we assume the exit door is immovable, and so when the ladder hits it, we say that it instantaneously stops. By this time, the entrance door has also closed, and so the ladder is stuck inside the garage. As its relative velocity is now zero, it is not length contracted, and is now longer than the garage; it will have to bend, snap, or explode.

Again, the puzzle comes from considering the situation from the frame of the ladder. In the above analysis, in its own frame, the ladder was always longer than the garage. So how did we ever close the doors and trap it inside?

It is worth noting here a general feature of relativity: we have deduced, by considering the frame of the garage, that we do indeed trap the ladder inside the garage. This must therefore be true in any frame – it cannot be the case that the ladder snaps in one frame but not in another. From the ladder's frame, then, we know that there must be some explanation for how the ladder came to be trapped; we must simply find the explanation.

The explanation is that, although all parts of the ladder simultaneously decelerate to zero in the garage's frame, because simultaneity is relative, the corresponding decelerations in the frame of the ladder are not simultaneous. Instead, each part of the ladder decelerates sequentially, from front to back, until finally the back of the ladder decelerates, by which time it is already within the garage.

As length contraction and time dilation are both controlled by the Lorentz transformations, the ladder paradox can be seen as a physical correlate of the twin paradox, in which instance one of a set of twins leaves earth, travels at speed for a period, and returns to earth a bit younger than the earthbound twin. As in the case of the ladder trapped inside the barn, if neither frame of reference is privileged – each is moving only relative to the other – how can it be that it's the traveling twin and not the stationary one who is younger (just as it is the ladder rather than the barn which is shorter)? In both instances it is the acceleration-deceleration that differentiates the phenomena: it is the twin, not the earth (or the ladder, not the barn) that undergoes the force of deceleration in returning to the temporal (or physical, in the case of the ladder-barn) inertial frame.

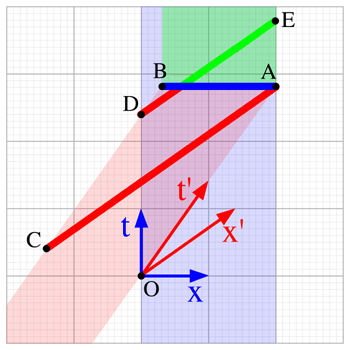
Figure 8: A Minkowski diagram of the case where the ladder is stopped all along its length, simultaneously in the garage frame. When this occurs, the garage frame sees the ladder as AB, but the ladder frame sees the ladder as AC. When the back of the ladder enters the garage at point D, it has not yet felt the effects of the acceleration of its front end. At this time, according to someone at rest with respect to the back of the ladder, the front of the ladder will be at point E and will see the ladder as DE. It is seen that this length in the ladder frame is not the same as CA, the rest length of the ladder before the deceleration.

== Ladder paradox and transmission of force ==
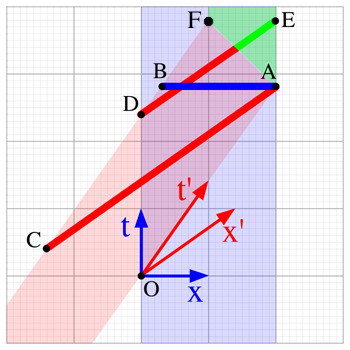
Figure 9: A Minkowski diagram of the case where the ladder is stopped by impact with the back wall of the garage. The impact is event A. At impact, the garage frame sees the ladder as AB, but the ladder frame sees the ladder as AC. The ladder does not move out of the garage, so its front end now goes directly upward, through point E. The back of the ladder will not change its trajectory in spacetime until it feels the effects of the impact. The effect of the impact can propagate outward from A no faster than the speed of light, so the back of the ladder will never feel the effects of the impact until point F (note the 45° angle of the line A-F, corresponding to the speed of light transmission of information) or later, at which time the ladder is well within the garage in both frames. Note that when the diagram is drawn in the frame of the ladder, the speed of light is the same, but the ladder is longer, so it takes more time for the force to reach the back end; this gives enough time for the back of the ladder to move inside the garage.

What if the back door (the door the ladder exits out of) is closed permanently and does not open? Suppose that the door is so solid that the ladder will not penetrate it when it collides, so it must stop. Then, as in the scenario described above, in the frame of reference of the garage, there is a moment when the ladder is completely within the garage (i.e., the back of the ladder is inside the front door), before it collides with the back door and stops. However, from the frame of reference of the ladder, the ladder is too big to fit in the garage, so by the time it collides with the back door and stops, the back of the ladder still has not reached the front door. This seems to be a paradox. The question is, does the back of the ladder cross the front door or not?

The difficulty arises mostly from the assumption that the ladder is rigid (i.e., maintains the same shape). Ladders seem rigid in everyday life. But being completely rigid requires that it can transfer force at infinite speed (i.e., when you push one end the other end must react immediately, otherwise the ladder will deform). This contradicts special relativity, which states that information can travel no faster than the speed of light (which is too fast for us to notice in real life, but is significant in the ladder scenario). So objects cannot be perfectly rigid under special relativity.

In this case, by the time the front of the ladder collides with the back door, the back of the ladder does not know it yet, so it keeps moving forwards (and the ladder "compresses"). In both the frame of the garage and the inertial frame of the ladder, the back end keeps moving at the time of the collision, until at least the point where the back of the ladder comes into the light cone of the collision (i.e., a point where force moving backwards at the speed of light from the point of the collision will reach it). At this point the ladder is actually shorter than the original contracted length, so the back end is well inside the garage. Calculations in both frames of reference will show this to be the case.

What happens after the force reaches the back of the ladder (the "green" zone in the diagram) is not specified. Depending on the physics, the ladder could break; or, if it were sufficiently elastic, it could bend and re-expand to its original length. At sufficiently high speeds, any realistic material would violently explode into a plasma.

== Man falling into grate variation ==
A man (represented by a segmented rod) falling into a grate

This early version of the paradox was originally proposed and solved by Wolfgang Rindler and involved a fast walking man, represented by a rod, falling into a grate. It is assumed that the rod is entirely over the grate in the grate frame of reference before the downward acceleration begins simultaneously and equally applied to each point in the rod.

From the perspective of the grate, the rod undergoes a length contraction and fits into the grate. However, from the perspective of the rod, it is the grate undergoing a length contraction, through which it seems the rod is then too long to fall.

The downward acceleration of the rod, which is simultaneous in the grate's frame of reference, is not simultaneous in the rod's frame of reference. In the rod's frame of reference, the front of the rod is first accelerated downward (shown in cell 3 of the drawing), and as time goes by, more and more of the rod is subjected to the downward acceleration, until finally the back of the rod is accelerated downward. This results in a bending of the rod in the rod's frame of reference. Since this bending occurs in the rod's rest frame, it is a true physical distortion of the rod which will cause stresses to occur in the rod.

For this non-rigid behaviour of the rod to become apparent, both the rod itself and the grate must be of such a scale that the traversal time is measurable.

== Bar and ring paradox ==
The diagram on the left illustrates a bar and a ring in the rest frame of the ring at the instant that their centers coincide. The bar is Lorentz-contracted and moving upward and to the right while the ring is stationary and uncontracted. The diagram on the right illustrates the situation at the same instant, but in the rest frame of the bar. The ring is now Lorentz-contracted and rotated with respect to the bar, and the bar is uncontracted. Again, the ring passes over the bar without touching it.

A problem very similar but simpler than the rod and grate paradox, involving only inertial frames, is the "bar and ring" paradox. The rod and grate paradox is complicated: it involves non-inertial frames of reference since at one moment the man is walking horizontally, and a moment later he is falling downward; and it involves a physical deformation of the man (or segmented rod), since the rod is bent in one frame of reference and straight in another. These aspects of the problem introduce complications involving the stiffness of the rod which tends to obscure the real nature of the "paradox". The "bar and ring" paradox is free of these complications: a bar, which is slightly larger in length than the diameter of a ring, is moving upward and to the right with its long axis horizontal, while the ring is stationary and the plane of the ring is also horizontal. If the motion of the bar is such that the center of the bar coincides with the center of the ring at some point in time, then the bar will be Lorentz-contracted due to the forward component of its motion, and it will pass through the ring. The paradox occurs when the problem is considered in the rest frame of the bar. The ring is now moving downward and to the left, and will be Lorentz-contracted along its horizontal length, while the bar will not be contracted at all. How can the bar pass through the ring?

The resolution of the paradox again lies in the relativity of simultaneity. The length of a physical object is defined as the distance between two simultaneous events occurring at each end of the body, and since simultaneity is relative, so is this length. This variability in length is just the Lorentz contraction. Similarly, a physical angle is defined as the angle formed by three simultaneous events, and this angle will also be a relative quantity. In the above paradox, although the rod and the plane of the ring are parallel in the rest frame of the ring, they are not parallel in the rest frame of the rod. The uncontracted rod passes through the Lorentz-contracted ring because the plane of the ring is rotated relative to the rod by an amount sufficient to let the rod pass through.

In mathematical terms, a Lorentz transformation can be separated into the product of a spatial rotation and a "proper" Lorentz transformation which involves no spatial rotation. The mathematical resolution of the bar and ring paradox is based on the fact that the product of two proper Lorentz transformations (horizontal and vertical) may produce a Lorentz transformation which is not proper (diagonal) but rather includes a spatial rotation component.

== See also ==
- Bell's spaceship paradox
- Ehrenfest paradox
- Physical paradox
- Relativity of simultaneity
- Supplee's paradox
- Twin paradox
