= Spaceship paradox =

Spaceship paradox or rocket paradox could refer to:

- Bell's spaceship paradox, a relativistic paradox
- Pendulum rocket fallacy, a simple mechanical paradox relating to rocket stability
