= Supplee's paradox =

Paradox in relativistic physics

In relativistic physics, Supplee's paradox (also called the submarine paradox) is a physical paradox that arises when considering the buoyant force exerted on a relativistic bullet (or in a submarine) immersed in a fluid subject to an ambient gravitational field. If a bullet has neutral buoyancy when it is at rest in a perfect fluid and then it is launched with a relativistic speed, observers at rest within the fluid would conclude that the bullet should sink, since its density will increase due to the length contraction effect. On the other hand, in the bullet's proper frame it is the moving fluid that becomes denser and hence the bullet would float. But the bullet cannot sink in one frame and float in another, so there is a paradox situation.

The paradox was first formulated by James M. Supplee (1989), where a non-rigorous explanation was presented. George Matsas has analysed this paradox in the scope of general relativity and also pointed out that these relativistic buoyancy effects could be important in some questions regarding the thermodynamics of black holes. A comprehensive explanation of Supplee's paradox through both the special and the general theory of relativity was presented by Ricardo Soares Vieira.

== Buoyancy ==
To simplify the analysis, it is customary to neglect drag and viscosity, and even to assume that the fluid has constant density.

An object immersed in a container of fluid subjected to a uniform gravitational field will be subject to a net downward gravitational force, compared with the net downward gravitational force on an equal volume of the fluid. If the object is less dense than the fluid, the weight of the displaced fluid is greater than the object’s weight. The difference between the forces results in an upward pointing vector, the buoyant force, and the object will rise. If the object is more dense than the fluid, it will sink. If the object and the fluid have equal density, the object is said to have neutral buoyancy and it will not experience any net force.

== Resolution ==
The resolution comes down to observing that the usual Archimedes principle cannot be applied in the relativistic case. If the theory of relativity is correctly employed to analyse the forces involved, there will be no true paradox.

Supplee himself concluded that the paradox can be resolved with a more careful analysis of the gravitational buoyancy forces acting on the bullet. Considering the reasonable (but not justified) assumption that the gravitational force depends on the kinetic energy content of the bodies, Supplee showed that the bullet sinks in the frame at rest with the fluid with the acceleration $g (\gamma^2-1)$, where $g$ is the gravitational acceleration and $\gamma$ is the Lorentz factor. In the proper reference frame of the bullet, the same result is obtained by noting that this frame is not inertial, which implies that the shape of the container will no longer be flat, on the contrary, the seafloor becomes curved upwards, which results in the bullet getting far away from the sea surface, i.e., in the bullet relatively sinking.

The non-justified assumption considered by Supplee that the gravitational force on the bullet should depend on its energy content was eliminated by George Matsas, who used the full mathematical methods of general relativity in order to explain the Supplee paradox and agreed with Supplee's results. In particular, he modelled the situation using a Rindler chart, where a submarine is accelerated from the rest to a given velocity v. Matsas concluded that the paradox can be resolved by noting that in the frame of the fluid, the shape of the bullet is altered, and derived the same result which had been obtained by Supplee. Matsas has applied a similar analysis to shed light on certain questions involving the thermodynamics of black holes.

Vieira has recently analysed the submarine paradox through both special and general relativity. In the first case, he showed that gravitomagnetic effects should be taken into account in order to describe the forces acting in a moving submarine underwater. When these effects are considered, a relativistic Archimedes principle can be formulated, from which he showed that the submarine must sink in both frames. Vieira also considered the case of a curved space-time in the proximity of the Earth. In this case, he assumed that the space-time can be approximately regarded as consisting of a flat space but a curved time. He showed that in this case the gravitational force between the Earth at rest and a moving body increases with the speed of the body in the same way as considered by Supplee ($F =\gamma m g$), providing in this way a justification for his assumption. Analysing the paradox again with this speed-dependent gravitational force, the Supplee paradox is explained and the results agree with those obtained by Supplee and Matsas.

Doing away with assumptions of how the gravitational force transforms between frames, Osama Karkout resolved the paradox within general relativity by using the spacetime metric to derive gravitational forces. Background Lorentz Transformations relate metric components between the two frames and show how both the weight of the submarine and the buoyancy force increase in the submarine's frame by a factor of $\gamma$, hence the two frames agree on whether it sinks or floats. This general-relativistic solution is technically simpler than the one by Matsas, doing away with his initial acceleration construction and shape analysis, and addressing the paradox directly as it was originally posed. It identifies the conceptual root of the paradox as the mistake of considering the spacetime metric of an observer moving with respect to Earth to be identical to that of observers at rest. Karkout also corrects an erroneous expression for the gravitational force used by Supplee and Vieira.

== See also ==
- Bell's spaceship paradox
- Ehrenfest paradox
- Ladder paradox
- Twin paradox
