= Twin paradox =

Thought experiment in special relativity

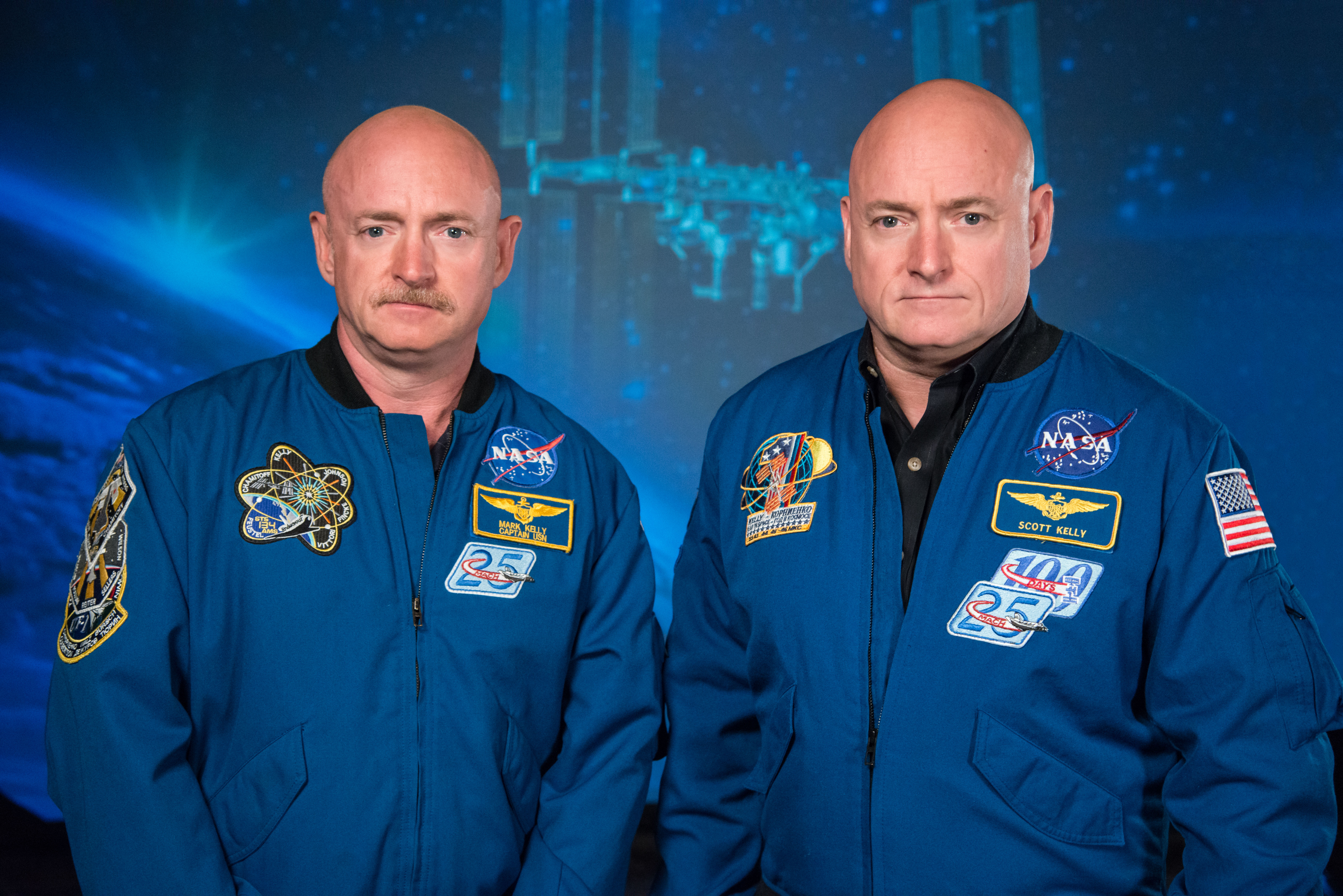
During the ISS year-long mission, astronaut Scott Kelly (right) aged about 8.6 milliseconds less than his twin brother Mark (left), on Earth, due to relativistic effects.

In physics, the twin paradox is a thought experiment in special relativity involving twins, one of whom takes a space voyage at relativistic speeds and returns home to find that the twin who remained on Earth has aged more. This result appears puzzling because each twin sees the other twin as moving, and so, as a consequence of an incorrect and naive application of time dilation and the principle of relativity, each should paradoxically find the other to have aged less. However, this scenario can be resolved within the standard framework of special relativity: the travelling twin's trajectory involves two different inertial frames, one for the outbound journey and one for the inbound journey. Another way to understand the paradox is to realise the travelling twin is undergoing acceleration, thus becoming a non-inertial observer. In both views there is no symmetry between the spacetime paths of the twins. Therefore, the twin paradox is not actually a paradox in the sense of a logical contradiction.

Starting with Paul Langevin in 1911, there have been various explanations of this paradox. These explanations "can be grouped into those that focus on the effect of different standards of simultaneity in different frames, and those that designate the acceleration [experienced by the travelling twin] as the main reason". Max von Laue argued in 1913 that since the travelling twin must be in two separate inertial frames, one on the way out and another on the way back, this frame switch is the reason for the ageing difference. Explanations put forth by Albert Einstein and Max Born invoked gravitational time dilation to explain the ageing as a direct effect of acceleration. However, it has been proven that neither general relativity, nor even acceleration, is necessary to explain the effect, as the effect still applies if two astronauts pass each other at the turnaround point and synchronise their clocks at that point. The situation at the turnaround point can be thought of as where a pair of observers, one travelling away from the starting point and another travelling toward it, pass by each other, and where the clock reading of the first observer is transferred to that of the second one, both maintaining constant speed, with both trip times being added at the end of their journey.

== History ==
In his paper on special relativity in 1905, Albert Einstein deduced that for two stationary and synchronous clocks that are placed at points A and B, if the clock at A is moved along the line AB and stops at B, the clock that moved from A would lag behind the clock at B. He stated that this result would also apply if the path from A to B was polygonal or circular. Einstein considered this to be a natural consequence of special relativity, not a paradox as some suggested, and in 1911, he restated and elaborated on this result as follows (with physicist Robert Resnick's comments following Einstein's):

Einstein: If we placed a living organism in a box ... one could arrange that the organism, after any arbitrary lengthy flight, could be returned to its original spot in a scarcely altered condition, while corresponding organisms which had remained in their original positions had already long since given way to new generations. For the moving organism, the lengthy time of the journey was a mere instant, provided the motion took place with approximately the speed of light.
Resnick: If the stationary organism is a man and the travelling one is his twin, then the traveller returns home to find his twin brother much aged compared to himself. The paradox centers on the contention that, in relativity, either twin could regard the other as the traveller, in which case each should find the other younger—a logical contradiction. This contention assumes that the twins' situations are symmetrical and interchangeable, an assumption that is not correct. Furthermore, the accessible experiments have been done and support Einstein's prediction.

In 1911, Paul Langevin derived differential ageing in round-trip experiments using portions of matter such as radium, showing by integration of the proper time of a co-moving accelerated observer, that the time experienced by that observer is shorter than for an observer in uniform motion, thus radium in motion is decaying at a slower rate. He went on to give a "striking example" by describing the story of a traveller making a trip at a Lorentz factor of γ = 100 (99.995% the speed of light). The traveller remains in a projectile for one year of their time, and then reverses direction. Upon return, the traveller will find that, having aged two years, 200 years have passed on Earth. During the trip, both the traveller and Earth keep sending signals to each other at a constant rate, which places Langevin's story among the Doppler shift versions of the twin paradox. The relativistic effects upon the signal rates are used to account for the different ageing rates. The asymmetry that occurred because only the traveller underwent acceleration is used to explain why there is any difference at all, because "any change of velocity, or any acceleration has an absolute meaning". (Note: Langevin, P. (July 1911) [Lecture 10 April 1911], "L'Évolution de l'espace et du temps", Scientia, X: 31–54; English translation The Evolution of Space and Time on Wikisource) Langevin's acceleration argument was subsequently also used by others such as Arnold Sommerfeld (1913), (Note: See p. 71 where he said that the result "does not indicate motion, but rather accelerated motion" in: Sommerfeld, A. (May 1913), "Remarks on Minkowski's "Space and Time"", in Otto Blumenthal (ed.), Das Relativitätsprinzip, pp. 69–73) Einstein (1918) (Note: Einstein, A. (1918), "Dialog about objections against the theory of relativity", Die Naturwissenschaften 48, pp. 697–702, 29 November 1918) or Max Born (1921) (Note: See pp. 190f. (special relativity), 250f (EP) in: Born, M. (1921), Die Relativitätstheorie Einsteins und ihre physikalischen Grundlagen (Second edition), Berlin: Springer; See also the English translation of the third edition by H. Brose (1924): Einstein's theory of relativity, pp. 214ff, 282ff.) in order specifically to point out that there is an asymmetry between the clocks.

Neither Einstein nor Langevin considered such results to be problematic: Einstein (1905) only called it "peculiar" while Langevin presented it as a consequence of absolute acceleration. (Note: "We are going to see this absolute character of the acceleration manifest itself in another form." ("Nous allons voir se manifester sous une autre forme ce caractère absolu de l'accélération."), page 82 of Langevin1911) They argued that, from the time differential illustrated by the story of the twins, no self-contradiction could be constructed. In other words, none of them saw the story of the twins as constituting a challenge to the self-consistency of relativistic physics. Max von Laue (1911) was apparently the first to use the expression "paradox" in relation to this experiment by writing: (Note: von Laue, Max (1911). "Zwei Einwände gegen die Relativitätstheorie und ihre Widerlegung". Physikalische Zeitschrift. 13: 118–120.; See also English translation Two Objections Against the Theory of Relativity and their Refutation on Wikisource)

Of all apparently paradox consequences that stem from the time-transformation of the theory of relativity, there is probably none against which the common sense of anyone who is still unfamiliar with the matter is more reluctant, than the one according to which the time indication of a clock shall be dependent on its state of motion. Already in his fundamental paper, Einstein has driven this paradox to the extreme by a thought experiment, recently explained in a very nice way by Langevin in a lecture that is also very readable in other respects.

Laue (1911, 1913) went on to elaborate on Langevin's explanation: (Note: von Laue, Max (1913). Das Relativitätsprinzip (2 ed.). Braunschweig, Germany: Friedrich Vieweg. OCLC 298055497.; See also English translation The Principle of Relativity, Second edition, Part III on Wikisource) Using Hermann Minkowski's spacetime formalism, he demonstrated that the world lines of the inertially moving bodies maximise the proper time elapsed between two events, which was also pointed out in the textbooks of Hermann Weyl (1918) (Note: See p. 147f. in Weyl, H. (March 1918), Raum-Zeit-Materie (first edition), Berlin: Springer; English translation of the 4th edition by H. Brose (1921): Space—Time—Matter, pp. 278f.) or Wolfgang Pauli (1921). (Note: See p. 558f (general description); p. 624f (proper time); p. 713f (accelerated frames); in: Pauli, W. (1921), "Die Relativitätstheorie", Encyclopädie der Mathematischen Wissenschaften, 5 (2): 539–776; English translation by G. Field (1958): Theory of Relativity) Regarding the § Role of acceleration, Laue wrote in 1913 that the asymmetric ageing is completely accounted for by the fact that the astronaut twin travels in two separate frames, while the Earth twin remains in one frame, and the time of acceleration can be made arbitrarily small compared with the time of inertial motion. (Note: von Laue, Max (1913). "Das Relativitätsprinzip". Jahrbücher der Philosophie. 1: 99–128.; See also English translation The Principle of Relativity (article) on Wikisource) Even before Laue, Emil Wiechert (1911) pointed out that there can be a time difference at reunion even when both clocks experience the same velocity changes or accelerations, (Note: See p. 745f. general derivation; p. 757f. space travel: Wiechert, E. (September 1911) [Lectures March-May 1911, submitted 26 July], "Relativitätsprinzip und Äther", Physikalische Zeitschrift, 12 (17–18): 689-707 published September 1, 737–758 published September 15) and in 1921 Wiechert removed any acceleration by introducing the "relay" or "three-brother" approach, in which the travelling twin transfers their clock reading to a third one, travelling in the opposite direction. (Note: See figures 1a and 1b on p. 25ff for the introduction of the "relay" (German: Stafette) using several non-accelerated clocks: Wiechert, E. (1922) [Lecture September 1921], "Prinzipielles über Äther und Relativität", Physikalische Zeitschrift, 23: 25–28)

In addition to Langevin's Doppler analysis, several methods have been invented to specifically show in which way the symmetry of time dilation is broken during turnaround from the perspective of the traveler: Hendrik Antoon Lorentz (1913) described that traveler's perspective in terms of two-way signals (radar) using three periods: In the first and the last, the stay-at-home clock moves at constant velocity and is therefore time dilated, yet in the middle period it apparently ticks faster which overcompensates the other periods and explains, why the traveler's clock is retarded at reunion with respect to the stay-at-home clock even from the traveler's own perspective. (Note: See pp. 37f, 55ff in: Lorentz, H. A. (1913), Het relativiteitsbeginsel : drie voordrachten gehouden in Teyler's stichting, Haarlem: De Erven Loosjes; German translation on pp. 31f, 47f in: Lorentz, H. A. (1914), Das Relativitätsprinzip. Drei Vorlesungen gehalten in Teylers Stiftung zu Haarlem, Leipzig and Berlin: B.G. Teubner) Alternatively, Hans Thirring (1921) used the Lorentz transformation to show that relativity of simultaneity leads to desynchronization of all the traveler's clocks during turnaround; this leads to an apparent forward jump of the stay-at-home clock which overcompensates its time dilation during constant velocity motion, all of which was visualized by Thirring using Minkowski diagrams. (Note: See p. 209ff in: Thirring, H. (April 1921), "Über das Uhrenparadoxon in der Relativitätstheorie", Naturwissenschaften, 9 (18): 209–212) The same result was already before obtained by Einstein (1918), who used the equivalence principle to show that a homogeneous gravitational field appears in the rest frame of the traveler at turnaround, which is accompanied by gravitational time dilation; since the "free-falling" stay-at-home clock is at a location of higher potential during turnaround, it advances at a faster rate which overcompensates its retardation during constant velocity motion. Einstein's explanation was adopted in 1921 in the textbooks of Wolfgang Pauli and Max Born.

Eventually, Hermann Weyl (1918) replaced the clocks and travelers explicitly by "twins", writing:

Suppose we have two twin-brothers who take leave from one another at a world-point A, and suppose one remains at home (that is, permanently at rest in an allowable reference-space), whilst the other sets out on voyages, during which he moves with velocities (relative to “home”) that approximate to that of light. When the wanderer returns home in later years he will appear appreciably younger than the one who stayed at home.

== Specific example ==
Consider a space ship travelling from Earth to the nearest star system: a distance d = 4 light years away, at a speed v = 0.8c (i.e., 80% of the speed of light).

To make the numbers easy, the ship is assumed to attain full speed in a negligible time upon departure (even though it would actually take about 9 months accelerating at 1 g to get up to speed). Similarly, at the end of the outgoing trip, the change in direction needed to start the return trip is assumed to occur in a negligible time. This can also be modelled by assuming that the ship is already in motion at the beginning of the experiment and that the return event is modelled by a Dirac delta distribution acceleration.

The parties will observe the situation as follows:

=== Earth perspective ===
The Earth-based mission control reasons about the journey this way: the round trip will take t = 2d/v = 10 years in Earth time (i.e. everybody who stays on Earth will be 10 years older when the ship returns). The amount of time as measured on the ship's clocks and the ageing of the travellers during their trip will be reduced by the factor $\alpha = \scriptstyle{\sqrt{1 - v^2/c^2}}$, the reciprocal of the Lorentz factor (time dilation). In this case α = 0.6 and the travellers will have aged only 0.6 × 10 = 6 years when they return.

=== Travellers' perspective ===
The ship's crew members also calculate the particulars of their trip from their perspective. They know that the distant star system and the Earth are moving relative to the ship at speed v during the trip. In their rest frame the distance between the Earth and the star system is α d = 0.6 × 4 = 2.4 light years (length contraction), for both the outward and return journeys. Each half of the journey takes α d / v = 2.4 / 0.8 = 3 years, and the round trip takes twice as long (6 years). Their calculations show that they will arrive home having aged 6 years. The travellers' final calculation about their ageing is in complete agreement with the calculations of those on Earth, though they experience the trip quite differently from those who stay at home.

=== Conclusion ===
Readings on Earth's and spaceship's clocks
Event	Earth (years)	Spaceship (years)
Departure	0	0
End of outgoing trip = Beginning of ingoing trip	5	3
Arrival	10	6

No matter what method they use to predict the clock readings, everybody will agree about them. If twins are born on the day the ship leaves, and one goes on the journey while the other stays on Earth, they will meet again when the traveller is 6 years old and the stay-at-home twin is 10 years old.

== Resolution of the paradox in special relativity ==
The paradoxical aspect of the twins' situation arises from the fact that at any given moment the travelling twin's clock is running slow in the earthbound twin's inertial frame, but based on the relativity principle one could equally argue that the earthbound twin's clock is running slow in the travelling twin's inertial frame. One proposed resolution is based on the fact that the earthbound twin is at rest in the same inertial frame throughout the journey, while the travelling twin is not: in the simplest version of the thought-experiment, the travelling twin switches at the midpoint of the trip from being at rest in an inertial frame which moves in one direction (away from the Earth) to being at rest in an inertial frame which moves in the opposite direction (towards the Earth). In this approach, determining which observer switches frames and which does not is crucial. Although both twins can legitimately claim that they are at rest in their own frame, only the travelling twin experiences acceleration when the spaceship engines are turned on. This acceleration, measurable with an accelerometer, makes their rest frame temporarily non-inertial. This reveals a crucial asymmetry between the twins' perspectives: although we can predict the ageing difference from both perspectives, we need to use different methods to obtain correct results.

=== Role of acceleration ===
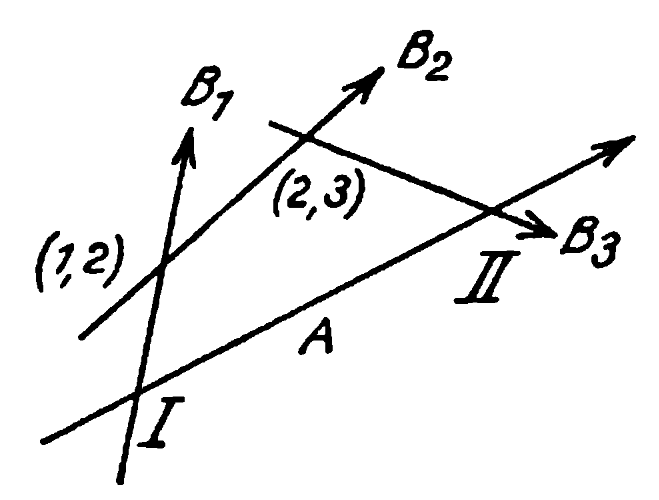
"Relay" experiment without acceleration, in which the traveler is replaced by three non-accelerated B-clocks, whose combined time is retarded with respect to the time of the single A-clock (Wiechert, 1921).

Differential aging despite identical accelerations (Wiechert, 1911).

Although some solutions attribute a crucial role to the acceleration of the travelling twin at the time of the turnaround, others note that the effect also arises if one imagines two separate travellers, one outward-going and one inward-coming, who pass each other and synchronise their clocks at the point corresponding to "turnaround" of a single traveller. In this "relay" or "three-brother" version (see figure on the left), physical acceleration of the travelling clock plays no direct role; "the issue is how long the world-lines are, not how bent". The length referred to here is the Lorentz-invariant length or "proper time interval" of a trajectory which corresponds to the elapsed time measured by a clock following that trajectory (see section § Difference in elapsed time as a result of differences in twins' spacetime paths below). In Minkowski spacetime, the travelling twin must feel a different history of accelerations from the earthbound twin, even if this just means accelerations of the same size separated by different amounts of time (see figure on the right), however "even this role for acceleration can be eliminated in formulations of the twin paradox in curved spacetime, where the twins can fall freely along space-time geodesics between meetings".

Animation illustrating the time difference for twins

The animation illustrates the time difference between twins in the twin paradox. The black line is the world line of the stationary (or uniformly moving) twin. The red line is the world line of the accelerating and decelerating twin. The momentarily frame is co-moving along the world line of the accelerating and decelerating twin. The numbers show clocks of both twins. The clocks start simultaneously. When the twins meet again, the red clock (moving nonuniformly) is delayed compared to the black one (moving uniformly). The vertical direction indicates time, while the horizontal indicates distance, the dashed line is the spacetime of the observer. The small dots are specific events in spacetime.

=== Relativity of simultaneity ===
Minkowski diagram of the twin paradox. There is a difference between the trajectories of the twins: the trajectory of the ship is equally divided between two different inertial frames, while the Earth-based twin stays in the same inertial frame.

For a moment-by-moment understanding of how the time difference between the twins unfolds, one must understand that in special relativity there is no concept of absolute present. For different inertial frames there are different sets of events that are simultaneous in that frame. This relativity of simultaneity means that switching from one inertial frame to another requires an adjustment in what slice through spacetime counts as the "present". In the spacetime diagram on the right, drawn for the reference frame of the Earth-based twin, that twin's world line coincides with the vertical axis (constant position in space, moving only in time). On the first leg of the trip, the second twin moves to the right (black sloped line); and on the second leg, back to the left. Blue lines show the planes of simultaneity for the travelling twin during the first leg of the journey; red lines, during the second leg. Just before turnaround, the travelling twin calculates the age of the Earth-based twin by measuring the interval along the vertical axis from the origin to the upper blue line. Just after turnaround, when recalculating, the travelling twin will measure the interval from the origin to the lower red line. In a sense, during the U-turn the plane of simultaneity jumps from blue to red and very quickly sweeps over a large segment of the world line of the Earth-based twin. When one transfers from the outgoing inertial frame to the incoming inertial frame there is a jump discontinuity in the age of the Earth-based twin (6.4 years in the example above).

== A non-spacetime approach ==
As mentioned above, an "out and back" twin paradox adventure may incorporate the transfer of clock reading from an "outgoing" astronaut to an "incoming" astronaut, thus eliminating the effect of acceleration. Also, the physical acceleration of clocks does not contribute to the kinematical effects of special relativity. Rather, in special relativity, the time differential between two reunited clocks is produced purely by uniform inertial motion, as discussed in Einstein's original 1905 relativity paper, as well as in all subsequent kinematical derivations of the Lorentz transformations.

Because spacetime diagrams incorporate Einstein's clock synchronisation (with its lattice of clocks methodology), there will be a requisite jump in the reading of the Earth clock time made by a "suddenly returning astronaut" who inherits a "new meaning of simultaneity" in keeping with a new clock synchronisation dictated by the transfer to a different inertial frame.

If, instead of incorporating Einstein's clock synchronisation (lattice of clocks), the astronaut (outgoing and incoming) and the Earth-based party regularly update each other on the status of their clocks by way of sending radio signals (which travel at light speed), then all parties will note an incremental buildup of asymmetry in time-keeping, beginning at the "turn around" point. Prior to the "turn around", each party regards the other party's clock to be recording time differently from their own, but the noted difference is symmetrical between the two parties. After the "turn around", the noted differences are not symmetrical, and the asymmetry grows incrementally until the two parties are reunited. Upon finally reuniting, this asymmetry can be seen in the actual difference showing on the two reunited clocks.

== Equivalence of biological ageing and clock time-keeping ==
All processes—chemical, biological, measuring apparatus functioning, human perception involving the eye and brain, the communication of force—are constrained by the speed of light. There is clock functioning at every level, dependent on light speed and the inherent delay at even the atomic level. Biological ageing, therefore, is in no way different from clock time-keeping. This means that biological ageing would be slowed in the same manner as a clock.

== What it looks like: the relativistic Doppler shift ==
In view of the frame-dependence of simultaneity for events at different locations in space, some treatments prefer a more phenomenological approach, describing what the twins would observe if each sent out a series of regular radio pulses, equally spaced in time according to the emitter's clock. This is equivalent to asking, if each twin sent a video feed of themselves to each other, what do they see in their screens? Or, if each twin always carried a clock indicating their age, what time would each see in the image of their distant twin's clock?

Shortly after departure, the travelling twin sees the stay-at-home twin with no time delay. At arrival, the image in the ship screen shows the staying twin as 1 year after launch, because radio emitted from Earth 1 year after launch gets to the other star 4 years afterwards and meets the ship there. During this leg of the trip, the travelling twin sees their own clock advance 3 years and the clock in the screen advance 1 year, so it seems to advance at 1/3 the normal rate, just 20 image seconds per ship minute. This combines the effects of time dilation due to motion (by factor α = 0.6, five years on Earth are 3 years on ship) and the effect of increasing light-time-delay (which grows from 0 to 4 years).

Of course, the observed frequency of the transmission is also 1/3 the frequency of the transmitter (a reduction in frequency; "red-shifted"). This is called the relativistic Doppler effect. The frequency of clock-ticks (or of wavefronts) which one sees from a source with rest frequency f_{rest} is

$$f_\mathrm{obs} = f_\mathrm{rest}\sqrt{\left({1 - v/c}\right)/\left({1 + v/c}\right)}$$

when the source is moving directly away. This is f_{obs} = 1/3f_{rest} for v/c = 0.8.

The stay-at-home twin gets a slowed signal from the ship for 9 years, at a frequency 1/3 the transmitter frequency. During these 9 years, the clock of the travelling twin in the screen seems to advance 3 years, so both twins see the image of their sibling ageing at a rate only 1/3 their own rate. Expressed in other way, they would both see the other's clock run at 1/3 their own clock speed. If they factor out of the calculation the fact that the light-time delay of the transmission is increasing at a rate of 0.8 seconds per second, both can work out that the other twin is ageing slower, at 60% rate.

Then the ship turns back toward home. The clock of the staying twin shows "1 year after launch" in the screen of the ship, and during the 3 years of the trip back it increases up to "10 years after launch", so the clock in the screen seems to be advancing 3 times faster than usual.

When the source is moving towards the observer, the observed frequency is higher ("blue-shifted") and given by

$$f_\mathrm{obs} = f_\mathrm{rest}\sqrt{\left({1 + v/c}\right)/\left({1 - v/c}\right)}$$

This is f_{obs} = 3f_{rest} for v/c = 0.8.

As for the screen on Earth, it shows that trip back beginning 9 years after launch, and the travelling clock in the screen shows that 3 years have passed on the ship. One year later, the ship is back home and the clock shows 6 years. So, during the trip back, both twins see their sibling's clock going 3 times faster than their own. Factoring out the fact that the light-time-delay is decreasing by 0.8 seconds every second, each twin calculates that the other twin is ageing at 60% their own ageing speed.

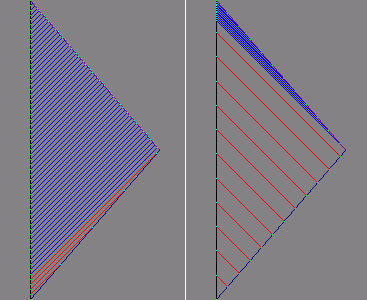
Light paths for images exchanged during trip Left: Earth to ship. Right: Ship to Earth. Red lines indicate low frequency images are received, blue lines indicate high frequency images are received

The x–t (space–time) diagrams at right show the paths of light signals travelling between Earth and ship (1st diagram) and between ship and Earth (2nd diagram). These signals carry the images of each twin and their age-clock to the other twin. The vertical black line is the Earth's path through spacetime and the other two sides of the triangle show the ship's path through spacetime (as in the Minkowski diagram above). As far as the sender is concerned, they transmit these at equal intervals (say, once an hour) according to their own clock; but according to the clock of the twin receiving these signals, they are not being received at equal intervals.

After the ship has reached its cruising speed of 0.8c, each twin would see 1 second pass in the received image of the other twin for every 3 seconds of their own time. That is, each would see the image of the other's clock going slow, not just slow by the ε factor 0.6, but even slower because light-time-delay is increasing 0.8 seconds per second. This is shown in the figures by red light paths. At some point, the images received by each twin change so that each would see 3 seconds pass in the image for every second of their own time. That is, the received signal has been increased in frequency by the Doppler shift. These high frequency images are shown in the figures by blue light paths.

=== Asymmetry in the Doppler shifted images ===
The asymmetry between the Earth and the space ship is manifested in this diagram by the fact that more blue-shifted (fast ageing) images are received by the ship. Put another way, the space ship sees the image change from a red-shift (slower ageing of the image) to a blue-shift (faster ageing of the image) at the midpoint of its trip (at the turnaround, 3 years after departure); the Earth sees the image of the ship change from red-shift to blue shift after 9 years (almost at the end of the period that the ship is absent). In the next section, one will see another asymmetry in the images: the Earth twin sees the ship twin age by the same amount in the red and blue shifted images; the ship twin sees the Earth twin age by different amounts in the red and blue shifted images.

== Calculation of elapsed time from the Doppler diagram ==
The twin on the ship sees low frequency (red) images for 3 years. During that time, the travelling twin would see the Earth twin in the image grow older by 3/3 = 1 year. The traveller then sees high frequency (blue) images during the back trip of 3 years. During that time, the Earth twin in the image would seem to grow older by 3 × 3 = 9 years. When the journey is finished, the image of the Earth twin has aged by 1 + 9 = 10 years.

The Earth twin sees 9 years of slow (red) images of the ship twin, during which the ship twin ages (in the image) by 9/3 = 3 years. Then, fast (blue) images are seen from Earth for the remaining 1 year until the ship returns. In the fast images, the ship twin ages by 1 × 3 = 3 years. The total ageing of the ship twin in the images received by Earth is 3 + 3 = 6 years, so the ship twin returns younger (6 years as opposed to 10 years on Earth).

=== Distinction between what they see and what they calculate ===
To avoid confusion, note the distinction between what each twin sees and what each would calculate. Each sees an image of their twin which they know originated at a previous time and which they know is Doppler-shifted. They do not take the elapsed time in the image as the age of their twin now.

- If they want to calculate when their twin was the age shown in the image (i.e. how old their twin themself was then), they have to determine how far away their twin was when the signal was emitted—in other words, one has to consider simultaneity for a distant event.
- If they want to calculate how fast their twin was ageing when the image was transmitted, they adjusts for the Doppler shift. For example, when receiving high frequency images (showing their twin ageing rapidly) with frequency $\scriptstyle{f_\mathrm{rest}\sqrt{\left({1 + v/c}\right)/\left({1 - v/c}\right)}}$, they do not conclude that the twin was ageing that rapidly when the image was generated, any more than they conclude that the siren of an ambulance is emitting the frequency they hear. They know that the Doppler effect has increased the image frequency by the factor 1 / (1 − v/c). Therefore, one calculates that the twin was ageing at the rate of

$$f_\mathrm{rest}\sqrt{\left({1 + v/c}\right)/\left({1 - v/c}\right)}\times \left(1 - v/c\right) = f_\mathrm{rest}\sqrt{1 - v^2/c^2}\equiv\epsilon f_\mathrm{rest}$$

when the image was emitted. A similar calculation reveals that his twin was ageing at the same reduced rate of εf_{rest} in all low frequency images.

=== Simultaneity in the Doppler shift calculation ===
It may be difficult to see where simultaneity came into the Doppler shift calculation, and indeed the calculation is often preferred because one does not have to worry about simultaneity. As seen above, the ship twin can convert the received Doppler-shifted rate to a slower rate of the clock of the distant clock for both red and blue images. When ignoring simultaneity, the ship twin might say the Earth twin was ageing at the reduced rate throughout the journey and therefore should be younger than they are. The ship twin is now back to square one, and has to take into account the change in their notion of simultaneity at the turnaround. The rate they can calculate for the image (corrected for Doppler effect) is the rate of the Earth twin's clock at the moment it was sent, not at the moment it was received. Since they receive an unequal number of red and blue shifted images, they should realise that the red and blue shifted emissions were not emitted over equal time periods for the Earth twin, and therefore they must account for simultaneity at a distance.

== Viewpoint of the travelling twin ==
During the turnaround, the travelling twin is in an accelerated reference frame. According to the equivalence principle, the travelling twin may analyse the turnaround phase as if the stay-at-home twin were freely falling in a gravitational field and as if the travelling twin were stationary. A 1918 paper by Einstein presents a conceptual sketch of the idea. From the viewpoint of the traveller, a calculation for each separate leg, ignoring the turnaround, leads to a result in which the Earth clocks age less than the traveller. For example, if the Earth clocks age 1 day less on each leg, the amount that the Earth clocks will lag behind amounts to 2 days. The physical description of what happens at turnaround has to produce a contrary effect of double that amount: 4 days' advancing of the Earth clocks. Then the traveller's clock will end up with a net 2-day delay on the Earth clocks, in agreement with calculations done in the frame of the stay-at-home twin.

The mechanism for the advancing of the stay-at-home twin's clock is gravitational time dilation. When an observer finds that inertially moving objects are being accelerated with respect to themselves, those objects are in a gravitational field insofar as relativity is concerned. For the travelling twin at turnaround, this gravitational field fills the universe. In a weak field approximation, clocks tick at a rate of t' = t (1 + Φ / c^{2}) where Φ is the difference in gravitational potential. In this case, Φ = gh where g is the acceleration of the travelling observer during turnaround and h is the distance to the stay-at-home twin. The rocket is firing towards the stay-at-home twin, thereby placing that twin at a higher gravitational potential. Due to the large distance between the twins, the stay-at-home twin's clocks will appear to be sped up enough to account for the difference in proper times experienced by the twins. It is no accident that this speed-up is enough to account for the simultaneity shift described above. The general relativity solution for a static homogeneous gravitational field and the special relativity solution for finite acceleration produce identical results.

Other calculations have been done for the travelling twin (or for any observer who sometimes accelerates), which do not involve the equivalence principle, and which do not involve any gravitational fields. Such calculations are based only on the special theory, not the general theory, of relativity. One approach calculates surfaces of simultaneity by considering light pulses, in accordance with Hermann Bondi's idea of the k-calculus. A second approach calculates a straightforward but technically complicated integral to determine how the travelling twin measures the elapsed time on the stay-at-home clock. An outline of this second approach is given in a separate section below.

== Difference in elapsed time as a result of differences in twins' spacetime paths ==
Twin paradox employing a rocket following an acceleration profile in terms of coordinate time T and by setting c=1: Phase 1 (a=0.6, T=2); Phase 2 (a=0, T=2); Phase 3-4 (a=-0.6, 2T=4); Phase 5 (a=0, T=2); Phase 6 (a=0.6, T=2). The twins meet at T=12 and τ=9.33. The blue numbers indicate the coordinate time T in the inertial frame of the stay-at-home-twin, the red numbers the proper time τ of the rocket-twin, and "a" is the proper acceleration. The thin red lines represent lines of simultaneity in terms of the different momentary inertial frames of the rocket-twin. The points marked by blue numbers 2, 4, 8 and 10 indicate the times when the acceleration changes direction.

The following paragraph shows several things:

- how to employ a precise mathematical approach in calculating the differences in the elapsed time
- how to prove exactly the dependency of the elapsed time on the different paths taken through spacetime by the twins
- how to quantify the differences in elapsed time
- how to calculate proper time as a function (integral) of coordinate time

Let clock K be associated with the "stay at home twin". Let clock K' be associated with the rocket that makes the trip. At the departure event both clocks are set to 0.

Phase 1: Rocket (with clock K') embarks with constant proper acceleration a during a time T_{a} as measured by clock K until it reaches some velocity V.
Phase 2: Rocket keeps coasting at velocity V during some time T_{c} according to clock K.
Phase 3: Rocket fires its engines in the opposite direction of K during a time T_{a} according to clock K until it is at rest with respect to clock K. The constant proper acceleration has the value −a, in other words the rocket is decelerating.
Phase 4: Rocket keeps firing its engines in the opposite direction of K, during the same time T_{a} according to clock K, until K' regains the same speed V with respect to K, but now towards K (with velocity −V).
Phase 5: Rocket keeps coasting towards K at speed V during the same time T_{c} according to clock K.
Phase 6: Rocket again fires its engines in the direction of K, so it decelerates with a constant proper acceleration a during a time T_{a}, still according to clock K, until both clocks reunite.

Knowing that the clock K remains inertial (stationary), the total accumulated proper time Δτ of clock K' will be given by the integral function of coordinate time Δt

$$\Delta \tau = \int \sqrt{ 1 - (v(t)/c)^2 } \ dt \$$

where v(t) is the coordinate velocity of clock K' as a function of t according to clock K, and, e.g. during phase 1, given by

$$v(t) = \frac{a t}{ \sqrt{1+  \left( \frac{a t}{c} \right)^2}}.$$

This integral can be calculated for the 6 phases:

Phase 1 $:\quad c / a \ \text{arsinh}( a \ T_a/c )\,$
Phase 2 $:\quad T_c \ \sqrt{ 1 - V^2/c^2 }$
Phase 3 $:\quad c / a \ \text{arsinh}( a \ T_a/c )\,$
Phase 4 $:\quad c / a \ \text{arsinh}( a \ T_a/c )\,$
Phase 5 $:\quad T_c \ \sqrt{ 1 - V^2/c^2 }$
Phase 6 $:\quad c / a \ \text{arsinh}( a \ T_a/c )\,$

where a is the proper acceleration, felt by clock K' during the acceleration phase(s) and where the following relations hold between V, a and T_{a}:

$$V = a \ T_a / \sqrt{ 1 + (a \ T_a/c)^2 }$$
$$a \ T_a = V / \sqrt{ 1 - V^2/c^2 }$$

So the travelling clock K' will show an elapsed time of

$$\Delta \tau = 2 T_c \sqrt{ 1 - V^2/c^2 } + 4 c / a \ \text{arsinh}( a \ T_a/c )$$

which can be expressed as

$$\Delta \tau = 2 T_c / \sqrt{ 1 + (a \ T_a/c)^2 } + 4 c / a \ \text{arsinh}( a \ T_a/c )$$

whereas the stationary clock K shows an elapsed time of

$$\Delta t = 2 T_c + 4 T_a\,$$

which is, for every possible value of a, T_{a}, T_{c} and V, larger than the reading of clock K':

$$\Delta t > \Delta \tau\,$$

== Difference in elapsed times: how to calculate it from the ship ==
Twin paradox employing a rocket following an acceleration profile in terms of proper time τ and by setting c = 1: Phase 1 (a = 0.6, τ = 2); Phase 2 (a = 0, τ = 2); Phase 3-4 (a = -0.6, 2τ = 4); Phase 5 (a = 0, τ = 2); Phase 6 (a = 0.6, τ = 2). The twins meet at T = 17.3 and τ = 12. This is a different voyage than the one shown above, as both schemes take the same assumed total point-of-view time: T=12 (stay-at-home), resp τ=12 (ship), so the results of the calculated other-one's times must be different: τ = 9.33 (ship), resp T = 17.3 (stay at home).

In the standard proper time formula

$$\Delta \tau = \int_0^{\Delta t} \sqrt{ 1 - \left(\frac{v(t)}{c}\right)^2 } \ dt, \$$

Δτ represents the time of the non-inertial (travelling) observer K' as a function of the elapsed time Δt of the inertial (stay-at-home) observer K for whom observer K' has velocity v(t) at time t.

To calculate the elapsed time Δt of the inertial observer K as a function of the elapsed time Δτ of the non-inertial observer K', where only quantities measured by K' are accessible, the following formula can be used:

$$\Delta t^2 = \left[ \int^{\Delta\tau}_0 e^{\int^{\bar{\tau}}_0 a(\tau')d \tau'} \, d \bar\tau\right] \,\left[\int^{\Delta \tau}_0 e^{-\int^{\bar\tau}_0 a(\tau')d \tau'} \, d \bar\tau \right], \$$

where a(τ) is the proper acceleration of the non-inertial observer K' as measured by themself (for instance with an accelerometer) during the whole round-trip. The Cauchy–Schwarz inequality can be used to show that the inequality Δt > Δτ follows from the previous expression:

$$\begin{align}
\Delta t^2 & = \left[ \int^{\Delta\tau}_0 e^{\int^{\bar{\tau}}_0 a(\tau')d\tau'} \, d \bar\tau\right] \,\left[\int^{\Delta \tau}_0 e^{-\int^{\bar\tau}_0 a(\tau')d \tau'} \, d \bar\tau \right] \\
& > \left[ \int^{\Delta\tau}_0 e^{\int^{\bar{\tau}}_0 a(\tau')d\tau'} \, e^{-\int^{\bar\tau}_0 a(\tau') \, d \tau'} \, d \bar\tau \right]^2 = \left[ \int^{\Delta\tau}_0 d \bar\tau \right]^2 = \Delta \tau^2.
\end{align}$$

Using the Dirac delta function to model the infinite acceleration phase in the standard case of the traveller having constant speed v during the outbound and the inbound trip, the formula produces the known result:

$$\Delta t = \frac{1}{\sqrt{1-\tfrac{v^2}{c^2}}} \Delta\tau .\$$

In the case where the accelerated observer K' departs from K with zero initial velocity, the general equation reduces to the simpler form:

$$\Delta t = \int^{\Delta\tau}_0 e^{\pm\int^{\bar{\tau}}_0 a(\tau')d \tau'} \, d \bar\tau , \$$

which, in the smooth version of the twin paradox where the traveller has constant proper acceleration phases, successively given by a, −a, −a, a, results in

$$\Delta t = \tfrac{4}{a} \sinh( \tfrac{a}{4} \Delta\tau) \$$

where the convention c = 1 is used, in accordance with the above expression with acceleration phases T_{a} = Δt/4 and inertial (coasting) phases T_{c} = 0.

== A rotational version ==
Twins Bob and Alice inhabit a space station in circular orbit around a massive body in space. Bob suits up and exits the station. While Alice remains inside the station, continuing to orbit with it as before, Bob uses a rocket propulsion system to cease orbiting and hover where he was. When the station completes an orbit and returns to Bob, he rejoins Alice. Alice is now younger than Bob. In addition to rotational acceleration, Bob must decelerate to become stationary and then accelerate again to match the orbital speed of the space station.

== No twin paradox in an absolute frame of reference ==
Einstein's conclusion of an actual difference in registered clock times (or ageing) between reunited parties caused Paul Langevin to posit an actual, albeit experimentally indiscernible, absolute frame of reference:

In 1911, Langevin wrote: "A uniform translation in the aether has no experimental sense. But because of this it should not be concluded, as has sometimes happened prematurely, that the concept of aether must be abandoned, that the aether is non-existent and inaccessible to experiment. Only a uniform velocity relative to it cannot be detected, but any change of velocity ... has an absolute sense."

In 1913, Henri Poincaré's posthumous Last Essays were published and there he had restated his position: "Today some physicists want to adopt a new convention. It is not that they are constrained to do so; they consider this new convention more convenient; that is all. And those who are not of this opinion can legitimately retain the old one."

In the relativity of Poincaré and Hendrik Lorentz, which assumes an absolute (though experimentally indiscernible) frame of reference, no paradox arises due to the fact that clock slowing (along with length contraction and velocity) is regarded as an actuality, hence the actual time differential between the reunited clocks.

In that interpretation, a party at rest with the totality of the cosmos (at rest with the barycenter of the universe, or at rest with a possible ether) would have the maximum rate of time-keeping and have non-contracted length. All the effects of Einstein's special relativity (consistent light-speed measure, as well as symmetrically measured clock-slowing and length-contraction across inertial frames) fall into place.

That interpretation of relativity, which John A. Wheeler calls "ether theory B (length contraction plus time contraction)", did not gain as much traction as Einstein's, which simply disregarded any deeper reality behind the symmetrical measurements across inertial frames. There is no physical test which distinguishes one interpretation from the other.

In 2005, Robert B. Laughlin (Physics Nobel Laureate, Stanford University), wrote about the nature of space: "It is ironic that Einstein's most creative work, the general theory of relativity, should boil down to conceptualizing space as a medium when his original premise [in special relativity] was that no such medium existed ... The word 'ether' has extremely negative connotations in theoretical physics because of its past association with opposition to relativity. This is unfortunate because, stripped of these connotations, it rather nicely captures the way most physicists actually think about the vacuum. ... Relativity actually says nothing about the existence or nonexistence of matter pervading the universe, only that any such matter must have relativistic symmetry (i.e., as measured)."

In Special Relativity (1968), A. P. French wrote: "Note, though, that we are appealing to the reality of A's acceleration, and to the observability of the inertial forces associated with it. Would such effects as the twin paradox (specifically – the time keeping differential between reunited clocks) exist if the framework of fixed stars and distant galaxies were not there? Most physicists would say no. Our ultimate definition of an inertial frame may indeed be that it is a frame having zero acceleration with respect to the matter of the universe at large."

== See also ==
- Bell's spaceship paradox
- Clock hypothesis
- Ehrenfest paradox
- Herbert Dingle
- Ladder paradox
- List of paradoxes
- Supplee's paradox
- Time dilation
- Time for the Stars
