= Wolfgang Rindler =

Austrian physicist (1924–2019)

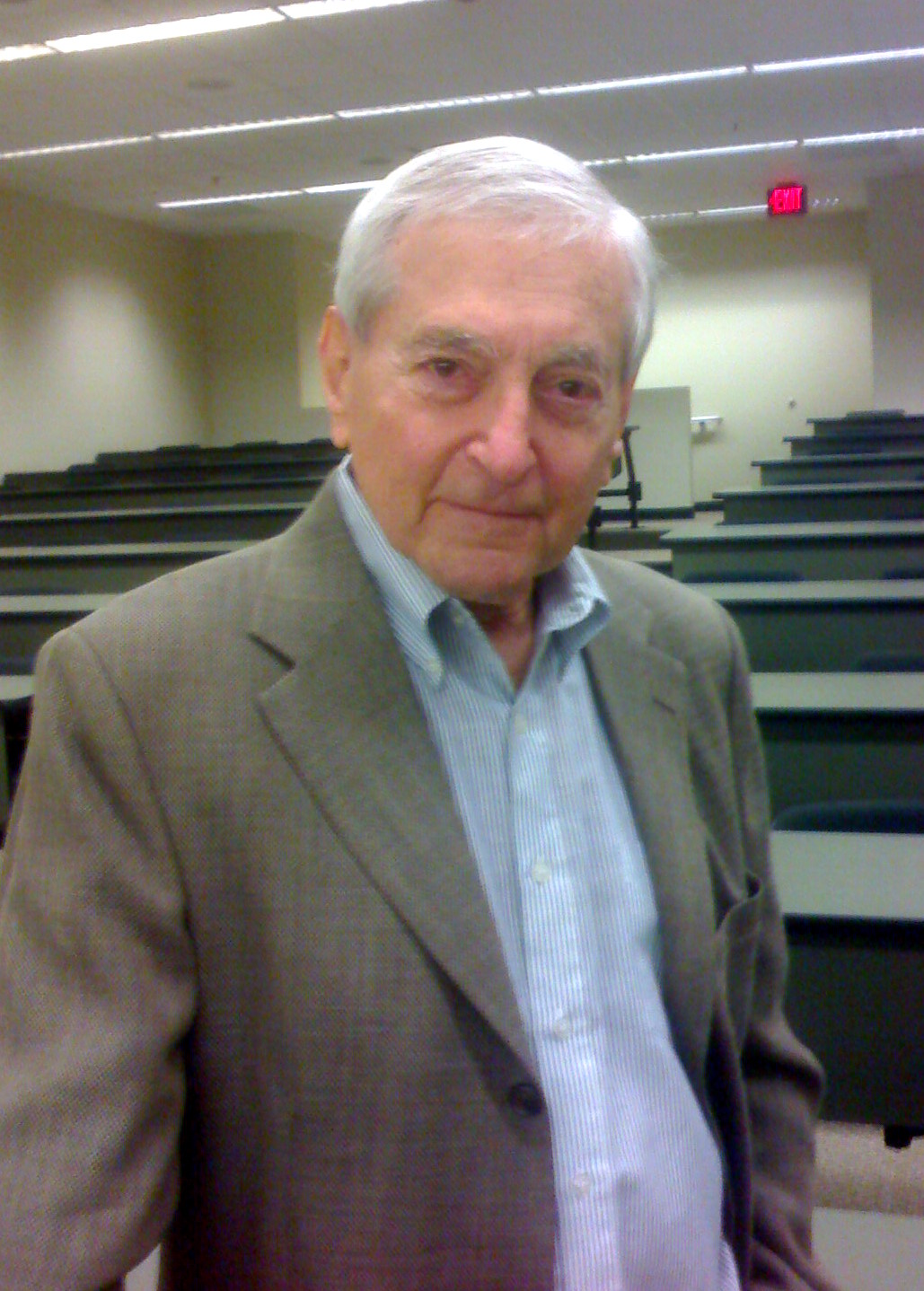
- Born: 18 May 1924; Vienna, Austria
- Died: 8 February 2019 (aged 94)
- Education: University of Liverpool; Imperial College London
- Known for: Event horizon Ladder paradox Rindler coordinates Spinorial relativity
- Scientific career
- Fields: Physics
- Institutions: University of Texas at Dallas
- Website: C.V. at U. Texas

Wolfgang Rindler (18 May 1924 – 8 February 2019) was an Austrian physicist studying general relativity. He is known for introducing the term "event horizon" for the boundary of a black hole, Rindler coordinates, and (in collaboration with Roger Penrose) for the use of spinors in general relativity. An honorary member of the Austrian Academy of Sciences and foreign member of the Accademia delle Scienze di Torino, he was also a prolific textbook author.

== Life and career ==
Born in Vienna on 18 May 1924, Wolfgang Rindler was the son of a lawyer. In 1938, his mother sent him to England through the auspices of the Kindertransport rescue of Jewish children from Germany and Austria. He gained his B.Sc. and M.Sc. from the University of Liverpool and his PhD from Imperial College London. From 1956 to 1963 he taught at Cornell University.

In 1960 Oliver & Boyd and InterScience published his first book on special relativity. Reviewer Alfred Schild said it was an "excellent, clear and concise account" and "provided a sound balance between physical ideas, analytical formulae and space-time geometry". (1966, second edition)

In 1961 Rindler used the FitzGerald contraction as the premise of his article "Length contraction paradox". The thought experiment is now called the ladder paradox.

In September 1963 he took up a position at the newly founded Southwest Center for Advanced Studies, the private research organization that in 1969 became the University of Texas at Dallas, where he was one of the founding faculty members. He was based at UTD for the remainder of his career, eventually becoming professor emeritus. He was visiting scholar at King's College London for the academic year 1961–1962, at the University La Sapienza in Rome for 1968–1969,

In 1969 Springer published the first edition of his Essential Relativity: Special, General, and Cosmological. The undergraduate textbook was lauded as a "refreshingly modern approach to the critical problem of teaching relativity theory." Another reviewer said it is "simply the best introduction" and is "filled with fabulous insights." When the second edition appeared in 1977 a reviewer noted its treatment "reminiscent of Mach's celebrated examination of the foundations of classical mechanics". On the other hand, the second edition "gives the barest hints of new developments" (models of neutron stars, in X-ray astronomy, supernova explosions, and quasars). Later, another reviewer criticized it for the paucity of diagrams, but lauded the chapter on cosmology as "lyrical, philosophical, yet technical."

Rindler was a visiting scholar at the University of Vienna in 1975 and 1987, and at Churchill College, Cambridge University, in 1990.

In 1982 Oxford University Press published Introduction to Special Relativity, with the second edition in 1991. A reviewer noted that other books provide a better introduction and intuitive understanding, but that it "should provide a useful reference for most applications of special relativity: kinematics, optics, particle mechanics, electromagnetism and mechanics of continua."

In 1984 Roger Penrose and Rindler published Spinors and Spacetime, volume 1, on "two-spinor calculus and relativistic fields". Michał Heller wrote that Spinors and Spacetime "is both elementary and highly advanced. It begins on an almost graduate level but soon, step by step, reaches the highest standards of modern mathematical physics."

In 2001 Oxford University Press published Relativity: Special, General and Cosmological, with a second edition in 2006. A reviewer noted "His writing is elegant, yet compact and logically precise." He was impressed with the "discussion of the internal structure of black holes analyzed first in Schwarzschild coordinates, and then in a masterful treatment of the Kruskal extension."

Wolfgang Rindler died at the age of 94 on 8 February 2019.

== Articles ==
Rindler published several articles in The American Journal of Physics (AJP):

- Rindler, W.; Sciama, D. W. (1961). "Radiation Pressure on a Rapidly Moving Surface". American Journal of Physics. 29 (9). American Association of Physics Teachers (AAPT): 643. Bibcode:1961AmJPh..29..643R. doi:10.1119/1.1937874. ISSN 0002-9505.
- Penrose, R.; Rindler, W. (1965). "Energy Conservation as the Basis of Relativistic Mechanics. I". American Journal of Physics. 33 (1). American Association of Physics Teachers (AAPT): 55–59. Bibcode:1965AmJPh..33...55P. doi:10.1119/1.1971232. ISSN 0002-9505.
- Ehlers, J.; Rindler, W.; Penrose, R. (1965). "Energy Conservation as the Basis of Relativistic Mechanics. II". American Journal of Physics. 33 (12). American Association of Physics Teachers (AAPT): 995–997. Bibcode:1965AmJPh..33..995E. doi:10.1119/1.1971205. hdl:11858/00-001M-0000-0013-5F0C-D. ISSN 0002-9505.
- Rindler, W. (1966). "What are Spinors?". American Journal of Physics. 34 (10). American Association of Physics Teachers (AAPT): 937–942. Bibcode:1966AmJPh..34..937R. doi:10.1119/1.1972301. ISSN 0002-9505.
- Rindler, W. (1966). "Kruskal Space and the Uniformly Accelerated Frame". American Journal of Physics. 34 (12). American Association of Physics Teachers (AAPT): 1174–1178. Bibcode:1966AmJPh..34.1174R. doi:10.1119/1.1972547. ISSN 0002-9505.
- Rindler, W. (1967). "World's Fastest Way to Get the Relativistic Time-Dilation Formula". American Journal of Physics. 35 (12). American Association of Physics Teachers (AAPT): 1165. Bibcode:1967AmJPh..35.1165R. doi:10.1119/1.1973819. ISSN 0002-9505.
- Rindler, W. (1968). "Counterexample to the Lenz-Schiff Argument". American Journal of Physics. 36 (6). American Association of Physics Teachers (AAPT): 540–544. Bibcode:1968AmJPh..36..540R. doi:10.1119/1.1974967. ISSN 0002-9505.
- Rindler, W. (1969). "Counterexample to the Tangherlini Argument". American Journal of Physics. 37 (1). American Association of Physics Teachers (AAPT): 72–73. Bibcode:1969AmJPh..37...72R. doi:10.1119/1.1975414. hdl:2060/19680020087. ISSN 0002-9505. S2CID 122823999.
- Rindler, W. (1970). "Einstein's Priority in Recognizing Time Dilation Physically". American Journal of Physics. 38 (9). American Association of Physics Teachers (AAPT): 1111–1115. Bibcode:1970AmJPh..38.1111R. doi:10.1119/1.1976561. ISSN 0002-9505.
- Rindler, Wolfgang; Denur, Jack (1988). "A simple relativistic paradox about electrostatic energy". American Journal of Physics. 56 (9). American Association of Physics Teachers (AAPT): 795. Bibcode:1988AmJPh..56..795R. doi:10.1119/1.15487. ISSN 0002-9505.
- Rindler, Wolfgang (1989). "Relativity and electromagnetism: The force on a magnetic monopole". American Journal of Physics. 57 (11). American Association of Physics Teachers (AAPT): 993–994. Bibcode:1989AmJPh..57..993R. doi:10.1119/1.15782. ISSN 0002-9505.
- Rindler, Wolfgang (1994). "General relativity before special relativity: An unconventional overview of relativity theory". American Journal of Physics. 62 (10). American Association of Physics Teachers (AAPT): 887–893. Bibcode:1994AmJPh..62..887R. doi:10.1119/1.17734. ISSN 0002-9505.
- Rindler, Wolfgang (2009). "Gödel, Einstein, Mach, Gamow, and Lanczos: Gödel's remarkable excursion into cosmology". American Journal of Physics. 77 (6). American Association of Physics Teachers (AAPT): 498–510. Bibcode:2009AmJPh..77..498R. doi:10.1119/1.3086933. ISSN 0002-9505.
