= Proper length =

Length of an object in the object's rest frame

Proper length or rest length is the length of an object in the object's rest frame.

The measurement of lengths is more complicated in the theory of relativity than in classical mechanics. In classical mechanics, lengths are measured based on the assumption that the locations of all points involved are measured simultaneously. But in the theory of relativity, the notion of simultaneity is dependent on the observer.

A different term, proper distance, provides an invariant measure whose value is the same for all observers.

Proper distance is analogous to proper time. The difference is that the proper distance is defined between two spacelike-separated events (or along a spacelike path), while the proper time is defined between two timelike-separated events (or along a timelike path).

== Proper length or rest length ==
The proper length or rest length of an object is the length of the object measured by an observer which is at rest relative to it, by applying standard measuring rods on the object. The measurement of the object's endpoints doesn't have to be simultaneous, since the endpoints are constantly at rest at the same positions in the object's rest frame, so it is independent of Δt. This length is thus given by:

$$L_{0} = \Delta x.$$

However, in relatively moving frames the object's endpoints have to be measured simultaneously, since they are constantly changing their position. The resulting length is shorter than the rest length, and is given by the formula for length contraction (with γ being the Lorentz factor):

$$L = \frac{L_0}{\gamma}.$$

In comparison, the invariant proper distance between two arbitrary events happening at the endpoints of the same object is given by:

$$\Delta\sigma = \sqrt{\Delta x^2 - c^2 \Delta t^2}.$$

So Δσ depends on Δt, whereas (as explained above) the object's rest length L_{0} can be measured independently of Δt. It follows that Δσ and L_{0}, measured at the endpoints of the same object, only agree with each other when the measurement events were simultaneous in the object's rest frame so that Δt is zero. As explained by Fayngold:

p. 407: "Note that the proper distance between two events is generally not the same as the proper length of an object whose end points happen to be respectively coincident with these events. Consider a solid rod of constant proper length l_{0}. If you are in the rest frame K_{0} of the rod, and you want to measure its length, you can do it by first marking its endpoints. And it is not necessary that you mark them simultaneously in K_{0}. You can mark one end now (at a moment t_{1}) and the other end later (at a moment t_{2}) in K_{0}, and then quietly measure the distance between the marks. We can even consider such measurement as a possible operational definition of proper length. From the viewpoint of the experimental physics, the requirement that the marks be made simultaneously is redundant for a stationary object with constant shape and size, and can in this case be dropped from such definition. Since the rod is stationary in K_{0}, the distance between the marks is the proper length of the rod regardless of the time lapse between the two markings. On the other hand, it is not the proper distance between the marking events if the marks are not made simultaneously in K_{0}."

== Proper distance between two events in flat space ==
In special relativity, the proper distance between two spacelike-separated events is the distance between the two events, as measured in an inertial frame of reference in which the events are simultaneous. In such a specific frame, the distance is given by
$$\Delta\sigma=\sqrt{\Delta x^2 + \Delta y^2 + \Delta z^2} ,$$
where

- Δx, Δy, and Δz are differences in the linear, orthogonal, spatial coordinates of the two events.

The definition can be given equivalently with respect to any inertial frame of reference (without requiring the events to be simultaneous in that frame) by
$$\Delta\sigma = \sqrt{\Delta x^2 + \Delta y^2 + \Delta z^2 - c^2 \Delta t^2},$$
where

- Δt is the difference in the temporal coordinates of the two events, and
- c is the speed of light.

The two formulae are equivalent because of the invariance of spacetime intervals, and since Δt = 0 exactly when the events are simultaneous in the given frame.

Two events are spacelike-separated if and only if the above formula gives a real, non-zero value for Δσ.

== Proper distance along a path ==
The above formula for the proper distance between two events assumes that the spacetime in which the two events occur is flat. Hence, the above formula cannot in general be used in general relativity, in which curved spacetimes are considered. It is, however, possible to define the proper distance along a path in any spacetime, curved or flat. In a flat spacetime, the proper distance between two events is the proper distance along a straight path between the two events. In a curved spacetime, there may be more than one straight path (geodesic) between two events, so the proper distance along a straight path between two events would not uniquely define the proper distance between the two events.

Along an arbitrary spacelike path P, the proper distance is given in tensor syntax by the line integral
$$L = c \int_P \sqrt{-g_{\mu\nu} dx^\mu dx^\nu} ,$$
where

- g_{μν} is the metric tensor for the current spacetime and coordinate mapping, and
- dx^{μ} is the coordinate separation between neighboring events along the path P.

In the equation above, the metric tensor is assumed to use the (+−−−) metric signature, and is assumed to be normalized to return a time instead of a distance. The minus sign in the equation should be dropped with a metric tensor that instead uses the (−+++) metric signature. Also, the c should be dropped with a metric tensor that is normalized to use a distance, or that uses geometrized units.

== See also ==
- Invariant interval
- Proper time
- Comoving distance
- Relativity of simultaneity
