= Length contraction =

Contraction of length in the direction of propagation in Minkowski space

Wheels which travel at 9/10 the speed of light. The speed of the top of a wheel is 0.994 c while the speed of the bottom is always zero. This is why the top is contracted relative to the bottom. This animation is made with the assumption that the spokes of a wheel are much more elastic than its circumference. Otherwise there could be a rupture of the spokes or of the circumference. In the rest frame of the center of a wheel, wheels are circular and their spokes are straight and equidistant, but their circumference is contracted and exerts a pressure on the spokes.

Length contraction is the phenomenon that a moving object's length is measured to be shorter than its proper length, which is the length as measured in the object's own rest frame. It is also known as Lorentz contraction or Lorentz–FitzGerald contraction (after Hendrik Lorentz and George Francis FitzGerald) and is usually only noticeable at a substantial fraction of the speed of light. Length contraction is only measured in the direction in which the body is travelling. For normal objects, this effect is negligible at everyday speeds, and can be ignored for all regular purposes, only becoming significant as the object approaches the speed of light relative to the observer.

== History ==
Length contraction was postulated by George FitzGerald (1889) and Hendrik Antoon Lorentz (1892) to explain the negative outcome of the Michelson–Morley experiment and to rescue the hypothesis of the stationary aether (Lorentz–FitzGerald contraction hypothesis). Although both FitzGerald and Lorentz alluded to the fact that electrostatic fields in motion were deformed ("Heaviside-Ellipsoid" after Oliver Heaviside, who derived this deformation from electromagnetic theory in 1888), it was considered an ad hoc hypothesis, because at this time there was no sufficient reason to assume that intermolecular forces behave the same way as electromagnetic ones. In 1897 Joseph Larmor developed a model in which all forces are considered to be of electromagnetic origin, and length contraction appeared to be a direct consequence of this model. Yet it was shown by Henri Poincaré (1905) that electromagnetic forces alone cannot explain the electron's stability. So he had to introduce another ad hoc hypothesis: non-electric binding forces (Poincaré stresses) that ensure the electron's stability, give a dynamical explanation for length contraction, and thus hide the motion of the stationary aether.

Lorentz believed that length contraction represented a physical contraction of the atoms making up an object. He envisioned no fundamental change in the nature of space and time. Lorentz expected that length contraction would result in compressive strains in an object that should result in measurable effects. Such effects would include optical effects in transparent media, such as optical rotation and induction of double refraction, and the induction of torques on charged condensers moving at an angle with respect to the aether.

Lorentz was perplexed by experiments such as the Trouton–Noble experiment and the experiments of Rayleigh and Brace, which failed to validate his theoretical expectations.

For mathematical consistency, Lorentz proposed a new time variable, the "local time", called that because it depended on the position of a moving body, following the relation t′ = t − vx/c^{2}. Lorentz considered local time not to be "real"; rather, it represented an ad hoc change of variable.

Impressed by Lorentz's "most ingenious idea", Poincaré saw more in local time than a mere mathematical trick. It represented the actual time that would be shown on a moving observer's clocks. On the other hand, Poincaré did not consider this measured time to be the "true time" that would be exhibited by clocks at rest in the aether. Poincaré made no attempt to redefine the concepts of space and time. To Poincaré, Lorentz transformation described the apparent states of the field for a moving observer. True states remained those defined with respect to the ether.

Albert Einstein removed the ad hoc character from the contraction hypothesis, declared the aether to be "superfluous" along with the concept of any absolutely stationary space and discussed length contraction effects in his 1905 paper on his theory of special relativity. Einstein proposed that Lorentz's transformation apply to both electromagnetism and mechanics. Hermann Minkowski gave the geometrical interpretation of all relativistic effects by introducing his concept of four-dimensional spacetime.

The numerous and confusing visual effects of combination of length contraction and the finite speed of light were poorly understood at first. Lorentz erroneously claimed in 1922 that they could be photographed. George Gamow showed bicycles as only foreshortened in his illustrations for Mr Tompkins in Wonderland. Even though a paper with the correct appearance of a moving rod was published in 1924, it was not widely read. Only in 1959 when James Terrell and Roger Penrose wrote about the visual effect now called Terrell rotation were the difficulties clear. Terrell's paper named "Invisibility of the Lorentz Contraction" said a meter stick would appear to be rotated and the contraction itself could measure from photographs without corrections for the finite velocity of light.

== Basis in relativity ==
In special relativity, the observer measures events against an infinite latticework of synchronized clocks.

First it is necessary to carefully consider the methods for measuring the lengths of resting and moving objects. Here, "object" simply means a distance with endpoints that are always mutually at rest, i.e., that are at rest in the same inertial frame of reference. If the relative velocity between an observer and the observed object is zero, then the proper length $L_0$ of the object can simply be determined by directly superposing a measuring rod. However, if the relative velocity is greater than zero, then one can proceed as follows:

Length contraction: Three blue rods are at rest in S, and three red rods in S'. At the instant when the left ends of A and D attain the same position on the axis of x, the lengths of the rods shall be compared. In S the simultaneous positions of the left side of A and the right side of C are more distant than those of D and F, while in S' the simultaneous positions of the left side of D and the right side of F are more distant than those of A and C.

The observer installs a row of clocks that either are synchronized a) by exchanging light signals according to the Poincaré–Einstein synchronization, or b) by "slow clock transport", that is, one clock is transported along the row of clocks in the limit of vanishing transport velocity. Now, when the synchronization process is finished, the object is moved along the clock row and every clock stores the exact time when the left or the right end of the object passes by. After that, the observer only has to look at the position of a clock A that stored the time when the left end of the object was passing by, and a clock B at which the right end of the object was passing by at the same time. It's clear that distance AB is equal to length $L$ of the moving object. Using this method, the definition of simultaneity is crucial for measuring the length of moving objects.

Another method is to use a clock indicating its proper time $T_0$, which is traveling from one endpoint of the rod to the other in time $T$ as measured by clocks in the rod's rest frame. The length of the rod can be computed by multiplying its travel time by its velocity, thus $L_{0} = T\cdot v$ in the rod's rest frame or $L = T_{0}\cdot v$ in the clock's rest frame.

In Newtonian mechanics, simultaneity and time duration are absolute and therefore both methods lead to the equality of $L$ and $L_0$. Yet in relativity theory the constancy of light velocity in all inertial frames in connection with relativity of simultaneity and time dilation destroys this equality. In the first method an observer in one frame claims to have measured the object's endpoints simultaneously, but the observers in all other inertial frames will argue that the object's endpoints were not measured simultaneously. In the second method, times $T$ and $T_0$ are not equal due to time dilation, resulting in different lengths too.

The deviation between the measurements in all inertial frames is given by the formulas for Lorentz transformation and time dilation (see Derivation). It turns out that the proper length remains unchanged and always denotes the greatest length of an object, and the length of the same object measured in another inertial reference frame is shorter than the proper length. This contraction only occurs along the line of motion, and can be represented by the relation

$$L = \frac{1}{\gamma(v)}L_0$$

where

- $L$ is the length observed by an observer in motion relative to the object
- $L_0$ is the proper length (the length of the object in its rest frame)
- $\gamma(v)$ is the Lorentz factor, defined as
  $$\gamma (v) \equiv \frac{1}{\sqrt{1 - v^2/c^2}}$$
  where
  - $v$ is the relative velocity between the observer and the moving object
  - $c$ is the speed of light

Replacing the Lorentz factor in the original formula leads to the relation

$$L = L_0\sqrt{1 - v^2/c^2}$$

In this equation both $L$ and $L_0$ are measured parallel to the object's line of movement. For the observer in relative movement, the length of the object is measured by subtracting the simultaneously measured distances of both ends of the object. For more general conversions, see the Lorentz transformations. An observer at rest observing an object travelling very close to the speed of light would observe the length of the object in the direction of motion as very near zero.

Then, at a speed of 13400000 m/s (30 million mph, 0.0447c) contracted length is 99.9% of the length at rest; at a speed of 42300000 m/s (95 million mph, 0.141c), the length is still 99%. As the magnitude of the velocity approaches the speed of light, the effect becomes prominent.

== Symmetry ==
The principle of relativity (according to which the laws of nature are invariant across inertial reference frames) requires that length contraction is symmetrical: If a rod is at rest in an inertial frame $S$, it has its proper length in $S$ and its length is contracted in $S'$. However, if a rod rests in $S'$, it has its proper length in $S'$ and its length is contracted in $S$. This can be vividly illustrated using symmetric Minkowski diagrams, because the Lorentz transformation geometrically corresponds to a rotation in four-dimensional spacetime.

== Magnetic forces ==
Magnetic forces are caused by relativistic contraction when electrons are moving relative to atomic nuclei. The magnetic force on a moving charge next to a current-carrying wire is a result of relativistic motion between electrons and protons.

In 1820, André-Marie Ampère showed that parallel wires having currents in the same direction attract one another. In the electrons' frame of reference, the moving wire contracts slightly, causing the protons of the opposite wire to be locally denser. As the electrons in the opposite wire are moving as well, they do not contract (as much). This results in an apparent local imbalance between electrons and protons; the moving electrons in one wire are attracted to the extra protons in the other. The reverse can also be considered. To the static proton's frame of reference, the electrons are moving and contracted, resulting in the same imbalance. The electron drift velocity is relatively very slow, on the order of a meter an hour but the force between an electron and proton is so enormous that even at this very slow speed the relativistic contraction causes significant effects.

This effect also applies to magnetic particles without current, with current being replaced with electron spin.

== Experimental verifications ==
Any observer co-moving with the observed object cannot measure the object's contraction, because he can judge himself and the object as at rest in the same inertial frame in accordance with the principle of relativity (as it was demonstrated by the Trouton–Rankine experiment). So length contraction cannot be measured in the object's rest frame, but only in a frame in which the observed object is in motion. In addition, even in such a non-co-moving frame, direct experimental confirmations of length contraction are hard to achieve, because (a) at the current state of technology, objects of considerable extension cannot be accelerated to relativistic speeds, and (b) the only objects traveling with the speed required are atomic particles, whose spatial extensions are too small to allow a direct measurement of contraction.

However, there are indirect confirmations of this effect in a non-co-moving frame:

- It was the negative result of a famous experiment, that required the introduction of length contraction: the Michelson–Morley experiment (and later also the Kennedy–Thorndike experiment). In special relativity its explanation is as follows: In its rest frame the interferometer can be regarded as at rest in accordance with the relativity principle, so the propagation time of light is the same in all directions. Although in a frame in which the interferometer is in motion, the transverse beam must traverse a longer, diagonal path with respect to the non-moving frame thus making its travel time longer, the factor by which the longitudinal beam would be delayed by taking times L/(c−v) and L/(c+v) for the forward and reverse trips respectively is even longer. Therefore, in the longitudinal direction the interferometer is supposed to be contracted, in order to restore the equality of both travel times in accordance with the negative experimental result(s). Thus the two-way speed of light remains constant and the round trip propagation time along perpendicular arms of the interferometer is independent of its motion and orientation.
- Given the thickness of the atmosphere as measured in Earth's reference frame, muons' extremely short lifespan shouldn't allow them to make the trip to the surface, even at the speed of light, but they do nonetheless. From the Earth reference frame, however, this is made possible only by the muon's time being slowed down by time dilation. However, in the muon's frame, the effect is explained by the atmosphere being contracted, shortening the trip.
- Heavy ions that are spherical when at rest should assume the form of "pancakes" or flat disks when traveling nearly at the speed of light— and in fact, the results obtained from particle collisions can only be explained when the increased nucleon density due to length contraction is considered.
- The ionization ability of electrically charged particles with large relative velocities is higher than expected. In pre-relativistic physics the ability should decrease at high velocities, because the time in which ionizing particles in motion can interact with the electrons of other atoms or molecules is diminished; however, in relativity, the higher-than-expected ionization ability can be explained by length contraction of the Coulomb field in frames in which the ionizing particles are moving, which increases their electrical field strength normal to the line of motion.
- In synchrotrons and free-electron lasers, relativistic electrons were injected into an undulator, so that synchrotron radiation is generated. In the proper frame of the electrons, the undulator is contracted which leads to an increased radiation frequency. Additionally, to find out the frequency as measured in the laboratory frame, one has to apply the relativistic Doppler effect. So, only with the aid of length contraction and the relativistic Doppler effect, the extremely small wavelength of undulator radiation can be explained.

== Reality of length contraction ==
Minkowski diagram of Einstein's 1911 thought experiment on length contraction. Two rods of rest length $A' B' = A'' B'' = L_0$ are moving with $0.6 c$ in opposite directions, resulting in $A^\ast B^\ast <L_0$.

In 1911 Vladimir Varićak asserted that one sees the length contraction in an objective way, according to Lorentz, while it is "only an apparent, subjective phenomenon, caused by the manner of our clock-regulation and length-measurement", according to Einstein. Einstein published a rebuttal:

The author unjustifiably stated a difference of Lorentz's view and that of mine concerning the physical facts. The question as to whether length contraction really exists or not is misleading. It doesn't "really" exist, in so far as it doesn't exist for a comoving observer; though it "really" exists, i.e. in such a way that it could be demonstrated in principle by physical means by a non-comoving observer.

— Albert Einstein, 1911

Einstein also argued in that paper, that length contraction is not simply the product of arbitrary definitions concerning the way clock regulations and length measurements are performed. He presented the following thought experiment: Let A'B' and A"B" be the endpoints of two rods of the same proper length L_{0}, as measured on x' and x" respectively. Let them move in opposite directions along the x* axis, considered at rest, at the same speed with respect to it. Endpoints A'A" then meet at point A*, and B'B" meet at point B*. Einstein pointed out that length A*B* is shorter than A'B' or A"B", which can also be demonstrated by bringing one of the rods to rest with respect to that axis.

== Paradoxes ==
Due to superficial application of the contraction formula, some paradoxes can occur. Examples are the ladder paradox and Bell's spaceship paradox. However, those paradoxes can be solved by a correct application of the relativity of simultaneity. Another famous paradox is the Ehrenfest paradox, which proves that the concept of rigid bodies is not compatible with relativity, reducing the applicability of Born rigidity, and showing that for a co-rotating observer the geometry is in fact non-Euclidean.

== Visual effects ==
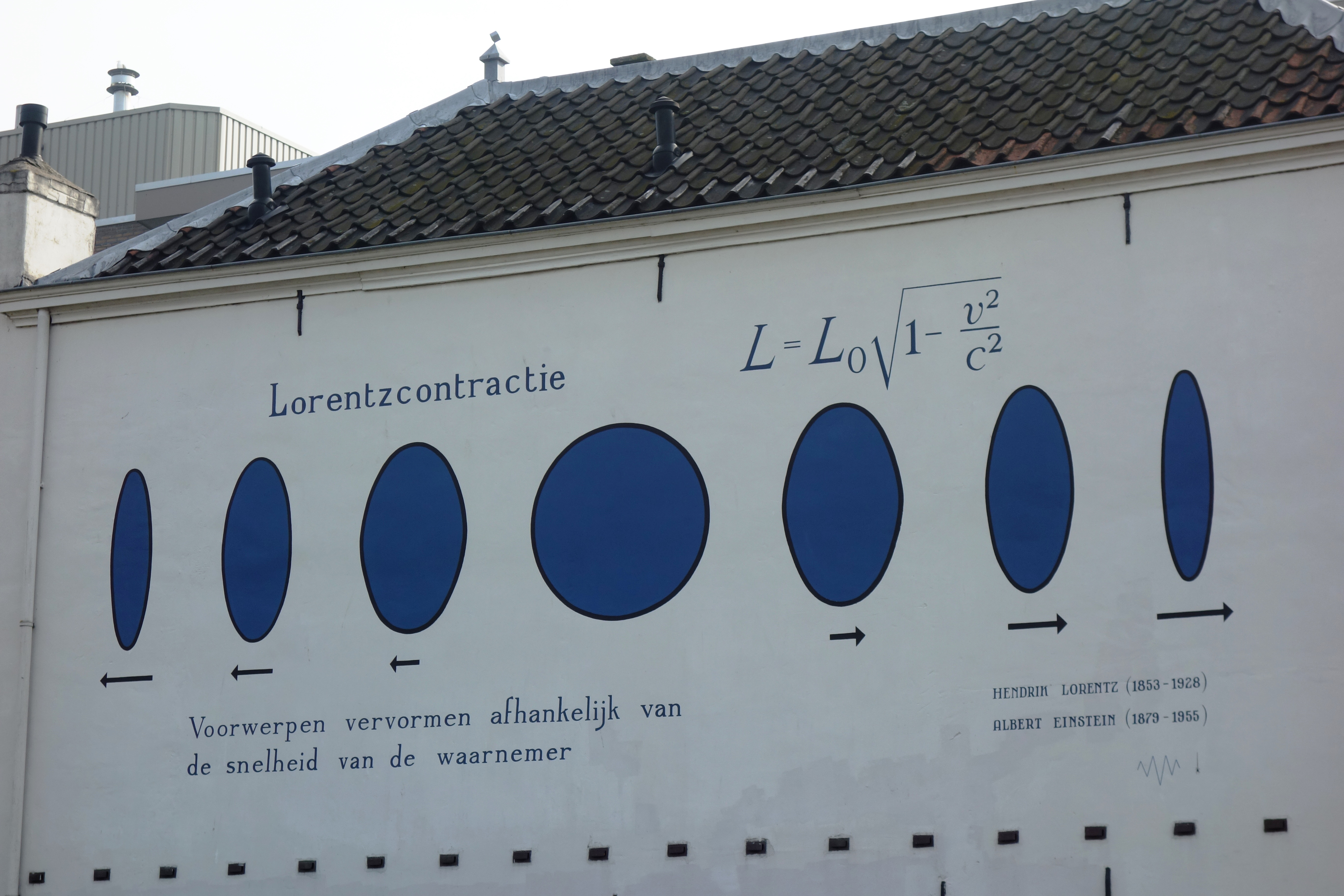
Formula on a wall in Leiden, Netherlands. Lorentz was chair of theoretical physics at the University of Leiden (1877–1910).

Length contraction refers to measurements of position made at simultaneous times according to a coordinate system. This could suggest that if one could take a picture of a fast moving object, that the image would show the object contracted in the direction of motion. However, such visual effects are completely different measurements, as such a photograph is taken from a distance, while length contraction can only directly be measured at the exact location of the object's endpoints. It was shown by several authors such as Roger Penrose and James Terrell that moving objects generally do not appear length contracted on a photograph. This result was popularized by Victor Weisskopf in a Physics Today article. For instance, for a small angular diameter, a moving sphere remains circular and is rotated. This kind of visual rotation effect is called Penrose-Terrell rotation.

== Derivation ==
Length contraction can be derived in several ways:

=== Known moving length ===
In an inertial reference frame S, let $x_{1}$ and $x_{2}$ denote the endpoints of an object in motion. In this frame the object's length $L$ is measured, according to the above conventions, by determining the simultaneous positions of its endpoints at $t_{1}=t_{2}$. Meanwhile, the proper length of this object, as measured in its rest frame S', can be calculated by using the Lorentz transformation. Transforming the time coordinates from S into S' results in different times, but this is not problematic, since the object is at rest in S' where it does not matter when the endpoints are measured. Therefore, the transformation of the spatial coordinates suffices, which gives:

$$x'_{1}=\gamma\left(x_{1}-vt_{1}\right)\quad\text{and}\quad x'_{2}=\gamma\left(x_{2}-vt_{2}\right) \ \ .$$

Since $t_1 = t_2$, and by setting $L=x_{2}-x_{1}$ and $L_{0}^{'}=x_{2}^{'}-x_{1}^{'}$, the proper length in S' is given by

| $L_{0}^{'}=L\cdot\gamma \ \ .$ | 1 |

Therefore, the object's length, measured in the frame S, is contracted by a factor $\gamma$:

| $L=L_{0}^{'}/\gamma \ \ .$ | 2 |

Likewise, according to the principle of relativity, an object that is at rest in S will also be contracted in S'. By exchanging the above signs and primes symmetrically, it follows that

| $L_{0}=L'\cdot\gamma \ \ .$ | 3 |

Thus an object at rest in S, when measured in S', will have the contracted length

| $L'=L_{0}/\gamma \ \ .$ | 4 |

=== Known proper length ===
Conversely, if the object rests in S and its proper length is known, the simultaneity of the measurements at the object's endpoints has to be considered in another frame S', as the object constantly changes its position there. Therefore, both spatial and temporal coordinates must be transformed:

$$\begin{align}
x_{1}^{'} & =\gamma\left(x_{1}-vt_{1}\right) & \quad\mathrm{and}\quad &  & x_{2}^{'} & =\gamma\left(x_{2}-vt_{2}\right)\\
t_{1}^{'} & =\gamma\left(t_{1}-vx_{1}/c^{2}\right) & \quad\mathrm{and}\quad &  & t_{2}^{'} & =\gamma\left(t_{2}-vx_{2}/c^{2}\right)
\end{align}$$

Computing length interval $\Delta x'=x_{2}^{\prime}-x_{1}^{\prime}$ as well as assuming simultaneous time measurement $\Delta t'=t_{2}^{\prime}-t_{1}^{\prime}=0$, and by plugging in proper length $L_{0}=x_{2}-x_{1}$, it follows:

$$\begin{align}\Delta x' & =\gamma\left(L_{0}-v\Delta t\right) & (1)\\
\Delta t' & =\gamma\left(\Delta t-\frac{vL_{0}}{c^{2}}\right)=0 & (2)
\end{align}$$

Equation (2) gives

$$\Delta t=\frac{vL_{0}}{c^{2}}$$

which, when plugged into (1), demonstrates that $\Delta x'$ becomes the contracted length $L'$:

$$L'=L_{0}/\gamma$$.

Likewise, the same method gives a symmetric result for an object at rest in S':

$$L=L^{'}_{0}/\gamma$$.

=== Using time dilation ===
Length contraction can also be derived from time dilation, according to which the rate of a single "moving" clock (indicating its proper time $T_0$) is lower with respect to two synchronized "resting" clocks (indicating $T$). Time dilation was experimentally confirmed multiple times, and is represented by the relation:

$$T=T_{0}\cdot\gamma$$

Suppose a rod of proper length $L_0$ at rest in $S$ and a clock at rest in $S'$ are moving along each other with speed $v$. Since, according to the principle of relativity, the magnitude of relative velocity is the same in either reference frame, the respective travel times of the clock between the rod's endpoints are given by $T=L_{0}/v$ in $S$ and $T'_{0}=L'/v$ in $S'$, thus $L_{0}=Tv$ and $L'=T'_{0}v$. By inserting the time dilation formula, the ratio between those lengths is:

$$\frac{L'}{L_{0}}=\frac{T'_{0}v}{Tv}=1/\gamma$$.

Therefore, the length measured in $S'$ is given by

$$L'=L_{0}/\gamma$$

So since the clock's travel time across the rod is longer in $S$ than in $S'$ (time dilation in $S$), the rod's length is also longer in $S$ than in $S'$ (length contraction in $S'$). Likewise, if the clock were at rest in $S$ and the rod in $S'$, the above procedure would give

$$L=L'_{0}/\gamma$$

=== Geometrical considerations ===
Cuboids in Euclidean and Minkowski spacetime

Additional geometrical considerations show that length contraction can be regarded as a trigonometric phenomenon, with analogy to parallel slices through a cuboid before and after a rotation in E^{3} (see left half figure at the right). This is the Euclidean analog of boosting a cuboid in E^{1,2}. In the latter case, however, we can interpret the boosted cuboid as the world slab of a moving plate.

Image: Left: a rotated cuboid in three-dimensional euclidean space E^{3}. The cross section is longer in the direction of the rotation than it was before the rotation. Right: the world slab of a moving thin plate in Minkowski spacetime (with one spatial dimension suppressed) E^{1,2}, which is a boosted cuboid. The cross section is thinner in the direction of the boost than it was before the boost. In both cases, the transverse directions are unaffected and the three planes meeting at each corner of the cuboids are mutually orthogonal (in the sense of E^{1,2} at right, and in the sense of E^{3} at left).

In special relativity, Poincaré transformations are a class of affine transformations which can be characterized as the transformations between alternative Cartesian coordinate charts on Minkowski spacetime corresponding to alternative states of inertial motion (and different choices of an origin). Lorentz transformations are Poincaré transformations which are linear transformations (preserve the origin). Lorentz transformations play the same role in Minkowski geometry (the Lorentz group forms the isotropy group of the self-isometries of the spacetime) which are played by rotations in euclidean geometry. Indeed, special relativity largely comes down to studying a kind of noneuclidean trigonometry in Minkowski spacetime, as suggested by the following table:

Three plane trigonometries
| Trigonometry | Circular | Parabolic | Hyperbolic |
|---|---|---|---|
| Kleinian geometry | Euclidean plane | Galilean plane | Minkowski plane |
| Symbol | E^{2} | E^{0,1} | E^{1,1} |
| Quadratic form | Positive definite | Degenerate | Non-degenerate but indefinite |
| Isometry group | E(2) | E(0,1) | E(1,1) |
| Isotropy group | SO(2) | SO(0,1) | SO(1,1) |
| Type of isotropy | Rotations | Shears | Boosts |
| Algebra over R | Complex numbers | Dual numbers | Split-complex numbers |
| ε^{2} | −1 | 0 | 1 |
| Spacetime interpretation | None | Newtonian spacetime | Minkowski spacetime |
| Slope | tan φ = m | tanp φ = u | tanh φ = v |
| "cosine" | cos φ = (1 + m^{2})^{−1/2} | cosp φ = 1 | cosh φ = (1 − v^{2})^{−1/2} |
| "sine" | sin φ = m (1 + m^{2})^{−1/2} | sinp φ = u | sinh φ = v (1 − v^{2})^{−1/2} |
| "secant" | sec φ = (1 + m^{2})^{1/2} | secp φ = 1 | sech φ = (1 − v^{2})^{1/2} |
| "cosecant" | csc φ = m^{−1} (1 + m^{2})^{1/2} | cscp φ = u^{−1} | csch φ = v^{−1} (1 − v^{2})^{1/2} |
