= Proper reference frame (flat spacetime) =

Coordinates system in an accelerating, "at rest" setting

A proper reference frame in the theory of relativity is a particular form of accelerated reference frame, that is, a reference frame in which an accelerated observer can be considered as being at rest. It can describe phenomena in curved spacetime, as well as in "flat" Minkowski spacetime in which the spacetime curvature caused by the energy–momentum tensor can be disregarded. Since this article considers only flat spacetime—and uses the definition that special relativity is the theory of flat spacetime while general relativity is a theory of gravitation in terms of curved spacetime—it is consequently concerned with accelerated frames in special relativity. (For the representation of accelerations in inertial frames, see the article Acceleration (special relativity), where concepts such as three-acceleration, four-acceleration, proper acceleration, hyperbolic motion etc. are defined and related to each other.)

A fundamental property of such a frame is the employment of the proper time of the accelerated observer as the time of the frame itself. This is connected with the clock hypothesis (which is experimentally confirmed), according to which the proper time of an accelerated clock is unaffected by acceleration, thus the measured time dilation of the clock only depends on its momentary relative velocity. The related proper reference frames are constructed using concepts like comoving orthonormal tetrads, which can be formulated in terms of spacetime Frenet–Serret formulas, or alternatively using Fermi–Walker transport as a standard of non-rotation. If the coordinates are related to Fermi–Walker transport, the term Fermi coordinates is sometimes used, or proper coordinates in the general case when rotations are also involved. A special class of accelerated observers follow worldlines whose three curvatures are constant. These motions belong to the class of Born rigid motions, i.e., the motions at which the mutual distance of constituents of an accelerated body or congruence remains unchanged in its proper frame. Two examples are Rindler coordinates or Kottler-Møller coordinates for the proper reference frame of hyperbolic motion, and Born or Langevin coordinates in the case of uniform circular motion.

In the following, Greek indices run over 0,1,2,3, Latin indices over 1,2,3, and bracketed indices are related to tetrad vector fields. The signature of the metric tensor is (-1,1,1,1).

== History ==
Some properties of Kottler-Møller or Rindler coordinates were anticipated by Albert Einstein (1907) (Note: Einstein, Albert (1908) [1907], "Über das Relativitätsprinzip und die aus demselben gezogenen Folgerungen" (PDF), Jahrbuch der Radioaktivität und Elektronik, 4: 411–462, Bibcode:1908JRE.....4..411E; English translation On the relativity principle and the conclusions drawn from it at Einstein paper project.) when he discussed the uniformly accelerated reference frame. While introducing the concept of Born rigidity, Max Born (1909) recognized that the formulas for the worldline of hyperbolic motion can be reinterpreted as transformations into a "hyperbolically accelerated reference system". Born himself, as well as Arnold Sommerfeld (1910) and Max von Laue (1911) used this frame to compute the properties of charged particles and their fields (see Acceleration (special relativity)#History and Rindler coordinates#History). In addition, Gustav Herglotz (1909) gave a classification of all Born rigid motions, including uniform rotation and the worldlines of constant curvatures. Friedrich Kottler (1912, 1914) introduced the "generalized Lorentz transformation" for proper reference frames or proper coordinates (German: Eigensystem, Eigenkoordinaten) by using comoving Frenet–Serret tetrads, and applied this formalism to Herglotz' worldlines of constant curvatures, particularly to hyperbolic motion and uniform circular motion. Herglotz' formulas were also simplified and extended by Georges Lemaître (1924). The worldlines of constant curvatures were rediscovered by several author, for instance, by Vladimír Petrův (1964), as "timelike helices" by John Lighton Synge (1967) or as "stationary worldlines" by Letaw (1981). The concept of proper reference frame was later reintroduced and further developed in connection with Fermi–Walker transport in the textbooks by Christian Møller (1952) or Synge (1960). An overview of proper time transformations and alternatives was given by Romain (1963), who cited the contributions of Kottler. In particular, Misner & Thorne & Wheeler (1973) combined Fermi–Walker transport with rotation, which influenced many subsequent authors. Bahram Mashhoon (1990, 2003) analyzed the hypothesis of locality and accelerated motion. The relations between the spacetime Frenet–Serret formulas and Fermi–Walker transport was discussed by Iyer & C. V. Vishveshwara (1993), Johns (2005) or Bini et al. (2008) and others. A detailed representation of "special relativity in general frames" was given by Gourgoulhon (2013).

== Comoving tetrads ==
=== Spacetime Frenet–Serret equations ===
For the investigation of accelerated motions and curved worldlines, some results of differential geometry can be used. For instance, the Frenet–Serret formulas for curves in Euclidean space have already been extended to arbitrary dimensions in the 19th century, and can be adapted to Minkowski spacetime as well. They describe the transport of an orthonormal basis attached to a curved worldline, so in four dimensions this basis can be called a comoving tetrad or vierbein $\mathbf{e}_{(\eta)}$ (also called vielbein, moving frame, frame field, local frame, repère mobile in arbitrary dimensions):

$$\begin{align}\frac{d\mathbf{e}_{(0)}}{d\tau} & =\kappa_{1}\mathbf{e}_{(1)}, & \frac{d\mathbf{e}_{(1)}}{d\tau} & =\kappa_{1}\mathbf{e}_{(0)}+\kappa_{2}\mathbf{e}_{(2)},\\ \frac{d\mathbf{e}_{(2)}}{d\tau} & =-\kappa_{2}\mathbf{e}_{(1)}+\kappa_{3}\mathbf{e}_{(3)},\quad & \frac{d\mathbf{e}_{(3)}}{d\tau} & =-\kappa_{3}\mathbf{e}_{(2)}, \end{align}$$	1

Here, $\tau$ is the proper time along the worldline, the timelike field $\mathbf{e}_{(0)}$ is called the tangent that corresponds to the four-velocity, the three spacelike fields are orthogonal to $\mathbf{e}_{(0)}$ and are called the principal normal $\mathbf{e}_{(1)}$, the binormal $\mathbf{e}_{(2)}$ and the trinormal $\mathbf{e}_{(3)}$. The first curvature $\kappa_{1}$ corresponds to the magnitude of four-acceleration (i.e., proper acceleration), the other curvatures $\kappa_{2}$ and $\kappa_{3}$ are also called torsion and hypertorsion.

=== Fermi–Walker transport and proper transport ===
While the Frenet–Serret tetrad can be rotating or not, it is useful to introduce another formalism in which non-rotational and rotational parts are separated. This can be done using the following equation for proper transport or generalized Fermi transport of tetrad $\mathbf{e}_{(\eta)}$, namely

$\frac{d\mathbf{e}_{(\eta)}}{d\tau}=-\boldsymbol{\vartheta}\mathbf{e}_{(\eta)}$	2

where

$$\vartheta^{\mu\nu}=\underset{\text{Fermi–Walker}}{\underbrace{A^{\mu}U^{\nu}-A^{\nu}U^{\mu}}}+\underset{\mathrm{\text{spatial rotation}}}{\underbrace{U_{\alpha}\omega_{\beta}\epsilon^{\alpha\beta\mu\nu}}}$$

or together in simplified form:

$$\frac{d\mathbf{e}_{(\eta)}}{d\tau}=-\left[(\mathbf{U}\wedge\mathbf{A})\mathbf{e}_{(\eta)}+\mathbf{R}\cdot\mathbf{e}_{(\eta)}\right]$$

with $\mathbf{U}$ as four-velocity and $\mathbf{A}$ as four-acceleration, and "$\cdot$" indicates the dot product and "$\wedge$" the wedge product. The first part $(\mathbf{U}\wedge\mathbf{A})\mathbf{e}_{(\eta)}=\mathbf{A}\left(\mathbf{U}\cdot\mathbf{e}_{(\eta)}\right)-\mathbf{U}\left(\mathbf{A}\cdot\mathbf{e}_{(\eta)}\right)$ represents Fermi–Walker transport, which is physically realized when the three spacelike tetrad fields do not change their orientation with respect to the motion of a system of three gyroscopes. Thus Fermi–Walker transport can be seen as a standard of non-rotation. The second part $\mathbf{R}$ consists of an antisymmetric second rank tensor with $\omega$ as the angular velocity four-vector and $\epsilon$ as the Levi-Civita symbol. It turns out that this rotation matrix only affects the three spacelike tetrad fields, thus it can be interpreted as the spatial rotation of the spacelike fields $\mathbf{e}_{(i)}$ of a rotating tetrad (such as a Frenet–Serret tetrad) with respect to the non-rotating spacelike fields $\mathbf{f}_{(i)}$ of a Fermi–Walker tetrad along the same world line.

=== Deriving Fermi–Walker tetrads from Frenet–Serret tetrads ===
Since $\mathbf{f}_{(i)}$ and $\mathbf{e}_{(i)}$ on the same worldline are connected by a rotation matrix, it is possible to construct non-rotating Fermi–Walker tetrads using rotating Frenet–Serret tetrads, which not only works in flat spacetime but for arbitrary spacetimes as well, even though the practical realization can be hard to achieve. For instance, the angular velocity vector between the respective spacelike tetrad fields $\mathbf{f}_{(i)}$ and $\mathbf{e}_{(i)}$ can be given in terms of torsions $\kappa_{2}$ and $\kappa_{3}$:

$\boldsymbol{\omega}=\kappa_{3}\mathbf{e}_{(1)}+\kappa_{2}\mathbf{e}_{(3)}$ and $\left|\boldsymbol{\omega}\right|=\sqrt{\kappa_{2}^{2}+\kappa_{3}^{2}}$	3a

Assuming that the curvatures are constant (which is the case in helical motion in flat spacetime, or in the case of stationary axisymmetric spacetimes), one then proceeds by aligning the spacelike Frenet–Serret vectors in the $\mathbf{e}_{(1)}-\mathbf{e}_{(3)}$ plane by constant counter-clockweise rotation, then the resulting intermediary spatial frame $\mathbf{h}_{(i)}$ is constantly rotated around the $\mathbf{h}_{(3)}$ axis by the angle $\Theta=\left|\boldsymbol{\omega}\right|\tau$, which finally gives the spatial Fermi–Walker frame $\mathbf{f}_{(i)}$ (note that the timelike field remains the same):

$$\begin{array}{c|c|c} \begin{align}\mathbf{h}_{(1)} & =\frac{\kappa_{2}\mathbf{e}_{(1)}-\kappa_{3}\mathbf{e}_{(3)}}{\left|\boldsymbol{\omega}\right|}\\ \mathbf{h}_{(2)} & =\mathbf{e}_{(2)}\\ \mathbf{h}_{(3)} & =\frac{\boldsymbol{\omega}}{\left|\boldsymbol{\omega}\right|} \end{align} & \begin{align}\mathbf{f}_{(1)} & =\mathbf{h}_{(1)}\cos\Theta-h_{(2)}\sin\Theta\\ \mathbf{f}_{(2)} & =\mathbf{h}_{(1)}\sin\Theta+h_{(2)}\cos\Theta\\ \mathbf{f}_{(3)} & =\mathbf{h}_{(3)} \end{align} & \mathbf{e}_{(0)}=\mathbf{h}_{(0)}=\mathbf{f}_{(0)}\end{array}$$	3b

For the special case $\kappa_{3}=0$ and $\mathbf{e}_{(3)}=[0,0,0,1]$, it follows $\boldsymbol{\omega}=\left[0,0,0,\ \kappa_{2}\right]$ and $\Theta=\left|\boldsymbol{\omega}\right|\tau=\kappa_{2}\tau$ and $\mathbf{h}_{(i)}=\mathbf{e}_{(i)}$, therefore (3b) is reduced to a single constant rotation around the $\mathbf{e}_{(3)}$-axis:

$$\begin{array}{c|c} \begin{align}\mathbf{f}_{(1)} & =\mathbf{e}_{(1)}\cos\Theta-\mathbf{e}_{(2)}\sin\Theta\\ \mathbf{f}_{(2)} & =\mathbf{e}_{(1)}\sin\Theta+\mathbf{e}_{(2)}\cos\Theta\\ \mathbf{f}_{(3)} & =\mathbf{e}_{(3)} \end{align} & \mathbf{e}_{(0)}=\mathbf{f}_{(0)}\end{array}$$	3c

== Proper coordinates or Fermi coordinates ==
In flat spacetime, an accelerated object is at any moment at rest in a momentary inertial frame $\mathbf{x}'=[x^{\prime0},x^{\prime1},x^{\prime2},x^{\prime3}]$, and the sequence of such momentary frames which it traverses corresponds to a successive application of Lorentz transformations $\mathbf{X}=\boldsymbol{\Lambda}\mathbf{x}'$, where $\mathbf{X}$ is an external inertial frame and $\boldsymbol{\Lambda}$ the Lorentz transformation matrix. This matrix can be replaced by the proper time dependent tetrads $\mathbf{e}_{(\nu)}(\tau)$ defined above, and if $\mathbf{\mathbf{q}}(\tau)$ is the time track of the particle indicating its position, the transformation reads:

$\mathbf{X}=\mathbf{\mathbf{q}}+\mathbf{e}_{(\nu)}\mathbf{x}'$	4a

Then one has to put $x^{\prime0}=t'=0$ by which $\mathbf{x}'$ is replaced by $\mathbf{r}=[x^{1},x^{2},x^{3}]$ and the timelike field $\mathbf{e}_{(0)}$ vanishes, therefore only the spacelike fields $\mathbf{e}_{(i)}$ are present anymore. Subsequently, the time in the accelerated frame is identified with the proper time of the accelerated observer by $x^{0}=t=\tau$. The final transformation has the form

$\mathbf{X}=\mathbf{q}+\mathbf{e}_{(i)}\mathbf{r}$,$\quad\left(x^{0}=\tau\right)$	4b

These are sometimes called proper coordinates, and the corresponding frame is the proper reference frame. They are also called Fermi coordinates in the case of Fermi–Walker transport (even though some authors use this term also in the rotational case). The corresponding metric has the form in Minkowski spacetime (without Riemannian terms):

$ds^{2}=-\left[(1+\mathbf{a}\cdot\mathbf{r}){}^{2}-(\boldsymbol{\omega}\times\mathbf{r}){}^{2}\right]d\tau^{2}+2(\boldsymbol{\omega}\times\mathbf{r})d\tau\ d\mathbf{r}+\delta_{ij}dx^{i}dx^{j}$	4c

However, these coordinates are not globally valid, but are restricted to

$-(1+\mathbf{a}\cdot\mathbf{r}){}^{2}+(\boldsymbol{\omega}\times\mathbf{r}){}^{2}<0$	4d

== Proper reference frames for timelike helices ==
In case all three Frenet–Serret curvatures are constant, the corresponding worldlines are identical to those that follow from the Killing motions in flat spacetime. They are of particular interest since the corresponding proper frames and congruences satisfy the condition of Born rigidity, that is, the spacetime distance of two neighbouring worldlines is constant. These motions correspond to "timelike helices" or "stationary worldlines", and can be classified into six principal types: two with zero torsions (uniform translation, hyperbolic motion) and four with non-zero torsions (uniform rotation, catenary, semicubical parabola, general case):

Case $\kappa_{1}=\kappa_{2}=\kappa_{3}=0$ produces uniform translation without acceleration. The corresponding proper reference frame is therefore given by ordinary Lorentz transformations. The other five types are:

=== Hyperbolic motion ===
The curvatures $\kappa_{1}=\alpha,$ $\kappa_{2}=\kappa_{3}=0$, where $\alpha$ is the constant proper acceleration in the direction of motion, produce hyperbolic motion because the worldline in the Minkowski diagram is a hyperbola:

$\mathbf{X}=\left[\frac{1}{\alpha}\sinh(\alpha\tau),\quad\frac{1}{\alpha}\left(\cosh(\alpha\tau)-1\right),\quad0,\quad0\right]$	5a

The corresponding orthonormal tetrad is identical to an inverted Lorentz transformation matrix with hyperbolic functions $\gamma=\cosh\eta$ as Lorentz factor and $v\gamma=\sinh\eta$ as proper velocity and $\eta=\operatorname{artanh}v=\alpha\tau$ as rapidity (since the torsions $\kappa_{2}$ and $\kappa_{3}$ are zero, the Frenet–Serret formulas and Fermi–Walker formulas produce the same tetrad):

$$\begin{align}\mathbf{e}_{(0)} & =(\cosh(\alpha\tau),\ \sinh(\alpha\tau),\ 0,\ 0)\\ \mathbf{e}_{(1)} & =(\sinh(\alpha\tau),\ \cosh(\alpha\tau),\ 0,\ 0)\\ \mathbf{e}_{(2)} & =(0,\ 0,\ 1,\ 0)\\ \mathbf{e}_{(3)} & =(0,\ 0,\ 0,\ 1) \end{align}$$	5b

Inserted into the transformations (4b) and using the worldline (5a) for $\mathbf{q}$, the accelerated observer is always located at the origin, so the Kottler-Møller coordinates follow

$$\begin{array}{c|c}
\begin{align}T & =\left(x+\frac{1}{\alpha}\right)\sinh(\alpha\tau)\\
X & =\left(x+\frac{1}{\alpha}\right)\cosh(\alpha\tau)-\frac{1}{\alpha}\\
Y & =y\\
Z & =z
\end{align}
& \begin{align}\tau & =\frac{1}{\alpha}\operatorname{artanh}\left(\frac{T}{X+\frac{1}{\alpha}}\right)\\
x & =\sqrt{\left(X+\frac{1}{\alpha}\right)^{2}-T^{2}}-\frac{1}{\alpha}\\
y & =Y\\
z & =Z
\end{align}
\end{array}$$

which are valid within $-1/\alpha<X<\infty$, with the metric

$$ds^{2}=-(1+\alpha x){}^{2}d\tau^{2}+dx^{2}+dy^{2}+dz^{2}$$.

Alternatively, by setting $\mathbf{\mathbf{q}}=0$ the accelerated observer is located at $X=1/\alpha$ at time $\tau=T=0$, thus the Rindler coordinates follow from (4b) and (5a, 5b):

$$\begin{array}{c|c} \begin{align}T & =x\sinh(\alpha\tau)\\ X & =x\cosh(\alpha\tau)\\ Y & =y\\ Z & =z \end{align} & \begin{align}\tau & =\frac{1}{\alpha}\operatorname{artanh}\frac{T}{X}\\ x & =\sqrt{X^{2}-T^{2}}\\ y & =Y\\ z & =Z \end{align} \end{array}$$

which are valid within $0<X<\infty$, with the metric

$$ds^{2}=-\alpha^{2}x^{2}d\tau^{2}+dx^{2}+dy^{2}+dz^{2}$$

=== Uniform circular motion ===
The curvatures $\kappa_{2}^{2}-\kappa_{1}^{2}>0$, $\kappa_{3}=0$ produce uniform circular motion, with the worldline

$X=\left[\gamma\tau,\ \frac{n}{p}\cos(p\tau),\ \frac{n}{p}\sin(p\tau),\ 0\right]$	6a

where

$$\begin{array}{c|c|c} \begin{align}\kappa_{1} & =-\gamma^{2}hp_{0}^{2}\\ \kappa_{2} & =\gamma^{2}p_{0} \end{align} & \begin{align}p & =\sqrt{\kappa_{2}^{2}-\kappa_{1}^{2}}=\frac{\kappa_{2}}{\gamma}=\gamma p_{0}\\ p_{0} & =\frac{\kappa_{2}^{2}-\kappa_{1}^{2}}{\kappa_{2}}=\frac{\kappa_{2}}{\gamma^{2}}=\frac{p}{\gamma}\\ \theta & =p\tau=p_{0}t=\gamma p_{0}\tau \end{align} & \begin{align}n & =\frac{\kappa_{1}}{p}=v\gamma=\sqrt{\gamma^{2}-1}\\ h & =\frac{\kappa_{1}}{\kappa_{2}^{2}-\kappa_{1}^{2}}=\frac{n}{p}\\ v & =\frac{\kappa_{1}}{\kappa_{2}}=hp_{0}=\frac{n}{\gamma}\\ \gamma & =\frac{\kappa_{2}}{p}=\frac{1}{\sqrt{1-v^{2}}}=\sqrt{n^{2}+1} \end{align} \end{array}$$	6b

with $h$ as orbital radius, $p_{0}$ as coordinate angular velocity, $p$ as proper angular velocity, $v$ as tangential velocity, $n$ as proper velocity, $\gamma$ as Lorentz factor, and $\theta$ as angle of rotation. The tetrad can be derived from the Frenet–Serret equations (1), or more simply be obtained by a Lorentz transformation of the tetrad $d_{(\nu)}$ of ordinary rotating coordinates:

$$\begin{array}{c|c} \begin{align}d_{(0)} & =(1,\ 0,\ 0,\ 0)\\ d_{(1)} & =(0,\ \cos\theta,\ \sin\theta,\ 0)\\ d_{(2)} & =(0,\ -\sin\theta,\ \cos\theta,\ 0)\\ d_{(3)} & =(0,\ 0,\ 0,\ 1) \end{align} & \begin{alignat}{1}\mathbf{e}_{(0)} & \ =\gamma\left(d_{(0)}+vd_{(2)}\right) & \ =\gamma(1,\ -v\sin\theta,\ v\cos\theta,\ 0)\\ \mathbf{e}_{(1)} & \ =d_{(1)} & \ =(0,\ \cos\theta,\ \sin\theta,\ 0)\\ \mathbf{e}_{(2)} & \ =\gamma\left(d_{(2)}+vd_{(0)}\right) & \ =\gamma\left(v,\ -\sin\theta,\ \cos\theta,\ 0\right)\\ \mathbf{e}_{(3)} & \ =d_{(3)} & \ =(0,\ 0,\ 0,\ 1) \end{alignat} \end{array}$$	6c

The corresponding non-rotating Fermi–Walker tetrad $\mathbf{f}_{(\eta)}$ on the same worldline can be obtained by solving the Fermi–Walker part of equation (2). Alternatively, one can use (6b) together with (3a), which gives

$$\boldsymbol{\omega}=\left[0,0,0,\gamma^{2}p\right],\quad\left|\boldsymbol{\omega}\right|=\gamma^{2}p,\quad\Theta=\left|\boldsymbol{\omega}\right|\tau=\gamma^{2}p_{0}\tau=\gamma p\tau=\gamma\theta$$

The resulting angle of rotation $\Theta$ together with (6c) can now be inserted into (3c), by which the Fermi–Walker tetrad follows

$$\begin{alignat}{1}\mathbf{f}_{(0)} & \ =\mathbf{e}_{(0)} & \ =\gamma(1,\ -v\sin\theta,\ v\cos\theta,\ 0)\\ \mathbf{f}_{(1)} & \ =\mathbf{e}_{(1)}\cos\Theta-\mathbf{e}_{(2)}\sin\Theta & \ =\left(-\gamma v\sin\Theta,\ \cos\theta\cos\Theta+\gamma\sin\theta\sin\Theta,\ \sin\theta\cos\Theta-\gamma\cos\theta\sin\Theta,\ 0\right)\\ \mathbf{f}_{(2)} & \ =\mathbf{e}_{(1)}\sin\Theta+\mathbf{e}_{(2)}\cos\Theta & \ =\left(\gamma v\cos\Theta,\ \cos\theta\sin\Theta-\gamma\sin\theta\cos\Theta,\ \sin\theta\sin\Theta+\gamma\cos\theta\cos\Theta,\ 0\right)\\ \mathbf{f}_{(3)} & \ =\mathbf{e}_{(3)} & \ =(0,\ 0,\ 0,\ 1) \end{alignat}$$

In the following, the Frenet–Serret tetrad is used to formulate the transformation. Inserting (6c) into the transformations (4b) and using the worldline (6a) for $\mathbf{q}$ gives the coordinates

$$\begin{array}{c|c} \begin{align}T & =\gamma\left(\tau+\gamma yv\right)\\ X & =(x+h)\cos\theta-y\gamma\sin\theta\\ Y & =(x+h)\sin\theta+y\gamma\cos\theta\\ Z & =z \end{align} & \begin{align}\tau & =\gamma^{-1}\left(T-\gamma yv\right)\\ x & =X\cos\theta+Y\sin\theta-h\\ y & =\gamma^{-1}\left(-X\sin\theta+Y\cos\theta\right)\\ z & =Z \end{align} \end{array}$$	6d

which are valid within $(X+h)^{2}+(\gamma Y)^{2}\leqq1/p_{0}^{2}$, with the metric

$$ds^{2}=-\gamma^{2}\left[1-(x+h)^{2}p_{0}^{2}-\gamma^{2}p_{0}^{2}y^{2}\right]d\tau^{2}+2\gamma^{2}p_{0}(x\ dy-y\ dx)d\tau+dx^{2}+dy^{2}+dz^{2}$$

If an observer resting in the center of the rotating frame is chosen with $h=0$, the equations reduce to the ordinary rotational transformation

$$\begin{array}{c|c|c} \begin{align}T & =t\\ X & =x\cos\theta-y\sin\theta\\ Y & =x\sin\theta+y\cos\theta\\ Z & =z \end{align} & \begin{align}t & =T\\ x & =X\cos\theta+Y\sin\theta\\ y & =-X\sin\theta+Y\cos\theta\\ z & =Z \end{align} & \text{or}\quad\begin{align}T & =t\\ X+iY & =(x+iy)e^{i\theta}\\ Z & =z \end{align} \end{array}$$	6e

which are valid within $0<\sqrt{X^{2}+Y^{2}}<1/p_{0}$, and the metric

$$ds^{2}=-\left[1-p_{0}^{2}\left(x^{2}+y^{2}\right)\right]dt^{2}+2p_{0}(-y\ dx+x\ dy)dt+dx^{2}+dy^{2}+dz^{2}$$.

The last equations can also be written in rotating cylindrical coordinates (Born coordinates):

$$\begin{array}{c|c|c|c} \begin{align}T & =t\\ X & =r\cos(\phi+\theta)\\ Y & =r\sin(\phi+\theta)\\ Z & =z \end{align} & \begin{align}t & =T\\ x & =r\cos(\Phi-\theta)\\ y & =r\sin(\Phi-\theta)\\ z & =Z \end{align} \rightarrow & \begin{align}T & =t\\ R & =r\\ \Phi & =\phi+\theta\\ Z & =z \end{align} & \begin{align}t & =T\\ r & =R\\ \phi & =\Phi-\theta\\ z & =Z \end{align} \end{array}$$	6f

which are valid within $0<r<1/p_{0}$, and the metric

$$ds^{2}=-\left(1-p_{0}^{2}r^{2}\right)dt^{2}+2p_{0}r^{2}dt\ d\phi+dr^{2}+r^{2}d\phi^{2}+dz^{2}$$

Frames (6d, 6e, 6f) can be used to describe the geometry of rotating platforms, including the Ehrenfest paradox and the Sagnac effect.

=== Catenary ===
The curvatures $\kappa_{1}^{2}-\kappa_{2}^{2}>0$, $\kappa_{3}=0$ produce a catenary, i.e., hyperbolic motion combined with a spacelike translation

$X=\left[\frac{\gamma}{a}\sinh(a\tau),\quad\frac{\gamma}{a}\cosh(a\tau),\quad n\tau,\quad0\right]$	7a

where

$$\begin{array}{c|c|c} \begin{align}\kappa_{1} & =\gamma a\\ \kappa_{2} & =na \end{align} & \begin{align}a & =\sqrt{\kappa_{1}^{2}-\kappa_{2}^{2}}\\ n & =\frac{\kappa_{2}}{a}=v\gamma=\sqrt{\gamma^{2}-1}\\ \eta & =a\tau \end{align} & \begin{align}v & =\frac{\kappa_{2}}{\kappa_{1}}=\frac{n}{\gamma}\\ \gamma & =\frac{\kappa_{1}}{a}=\frac{1}{\sqrt{1-v^{2}}}=\sqrt{n^{2}+1} \end{align} \end{array}$$	7b

where $v$ is the velocity, $n$ the proper velocity, $\eta$ as rapidity, $\gamma$ is the Lorentz factor. The corresponding Frenet–Serret tetrad is:

$$\begin{align}\mathbf{e}_{(0)} & =\left(\gamma\cosh\eta,\ \gamma\sinh\eta,\ n,\ 0\right)\\ \mathbf{e}_{(1)} & =\left(\sinh\eta,\ \cosh\eta,\ 0,\ 0\right)\\ \mathbf{e}_{(2)} & =\left(-n\cosh\eta,\ -n\sinh\eta,\ -\gamma,\ 0\right)\\ \mathbf{e}_{(3)} & =\left(0,\ 0,\ 0,\ 1\right) \end{align}$$

The corresponding non-rotating Fermi–Walker tetrad $\mathbf{f}_{(\eta)}$ on the same worldline can be obtained by solving the Fermi–Walker part of equation (2). The same result follows from (3a), which gives

$$\boldsymbol{\omega}=\left[0,0,0,na\right],\quad\left|\boldsymbol{\omega}\right|=na,\quad\Theta=\left|\boldsymbol{\omega}\right|\tau=na\tau$$

which together with (7a) can now be inserted into (3c), resulting in the Fermi–Walker tetrad

$$\begin{alignat}{1}
\mathbf{f}_{(0)} & \ =\mathbf{e}_{(0)} & \ =\left(\gamma\cosh\eta,\ \gamma\sinh\eta,\ n,\ 0\right)\\
\mathbf{f}_{(1)} & \ =\mathbf{e}_{(1)}\cos\Theta-\mathbf{e}_{(2)}\sin\Theta & \ =\left(\sinh\eta\cos\Theta+n\cosh\eta\sin\Theta,\ \cosh\eta\cos\Theta+n\sinh\eta\sin\Theta,\ \gamma\sin\Theta,\ 0\right)\\
\mathbf{f}_{(2)} & \ =\mathbf{e}_{(1)}\sin\Theta+\mathbf{e}_{(2)}\cos\Theta & \ =\left(\sinh\eta\sin\Theta-n\cosh\eta\cos\Theta,\ \cosh\eta\sin\Theta-n\sinh\eta\cos\Theta,\ -\gamma\cos\Theta\ 0\right)\\
\mathbf{f}_{(3)} & \ =\mathbf{e}_{(3)} & \ =\left(0,\ 0,\ 0,\ 1\right)
\end{alignat}$$

The proper coordinates or Fermi coordinates follow by inserting $\mathbf{e}_{(\eta)}$ or $\mathbf{f}_{(\eta)}$ into (4b).

=== Semicubical parabola ===
The curvatures $\kappa_{1}^{2}-\kappa_{2}^{2}=0$, $\kappa_{3}=0$ produce a semicubical parabola or cusped motion

$X=\left[\tau+\frac{1}{6}a^{2}\tau^{3},\ \frac{1}{2}a\tau^{2},\ \frac{1}{6}a^{2}\tau^{3},\ 0\right]$ with $a=\kappa_{1}=\kappa_{2}$	8

The corresponding Frenet–Serret tetrad with $\theta=a\tau$ is:

$$\begin{align}\mathbf{e}_{(0)} & =\left(1+\frac{1}{2}\theta^{2},\ \theta,\ \frac{1}{2}\theta^{2},\ 0\right)\\ \mathbf{e}_{(1)} & =\left(\theta,\ 1,\ \theta,\ 0\right)\\ \mathbf{e}_{(2)} & =\left(-\frac{1}{2}\theta^{2},\ -\theta,\ 1-\frac{1}{2}\theta^{2},\ 0\right)\\ \mathbf{e}_{(3)} & =\left(0,\ 0,\ 0,\ 1\right) \end{align}$$

The corresponding non-rotating Fermi–Walker tetrad $\mathbf{f}_{(\eta)}$ on the same worldline can be obtained by solving the Fermi–Walker part of equation (2). The same result follows from (3a), which gives

$$\boldsymbol{\omega}=\left[0,0,0,a\right],\quad\left|\boldsymbol{\omega}\right|=a,\quad\Theta=\left|\boldsymbol{\omega}\right|\tau=a\tau=\theta$$

which together with (8) can now be inserted into (3c), resulting in the Fermi–Walker tetrad (note that $\Theta=\theta$ in this case):

$$\begin{alignat}{1}
\mathbf{f}_{(0)} & \ =\mathbf{e}_{(0)} & \ =\left(1+\frac{1}{2}\theta^{2},\ \theta,\ \frac{1}{2}\theta^{2},\ 0\right)\\
\mathbf{f}_{(1)} & \ =\mathbf{e}_{(1)}\cos\Theta-\mathbf{e}_{(2)}\sin\Theta & \ =\left(\theta\cos\theta+\frac{1}{2}\theta^{2}\sin\theta,\ \cos\theta+\theta\sin\theta,\ \theta\cos\theta+\left(\frac{1}{2}\theta^{2}-1\right)\sin\theta,\ 0\right)\\
\mathbf{f}_{(2)} & \ =\mathbf{e}_{(1)}\sin\Theta+\mathbf{e}_{(2)}\cos\Theta & \ =\left(\theta\sin\theta-\frac{1}{2}\theta^{2}\cos\theta,\ \sin\theta-\theta\cos\theta,\ \theta\sin\theta-\left(\frac{1}{2}\theta^{2}-1\right)\cos\theta,\ 0\right)\\
\mathbf{f}_{(3)} & \ =\mathbf{e}_{(3)} & \ =\left(0,\ 0,\ 0,\ 1\right)
\end{alignat}$$

The proper coordinates or Fermi coordinates follow by inserting $\mathbf{e}_{(\eta)}$ or $\mathbf{f}_{(\eta)}$ into (4b).

=== General case ===
The curvatures $\kappa_{1}\ne0$, $\kappa_{2}\ne0$, $\kappa_{3}\ne0$ produce hyperbolic motion combined with uniform circular motion. The worldline is given by

$X=\left[\frac{\gamma}{a}\sinh(a\tau),\quad\frac{\gamma}{a}\cosh(a\tau),\quad\frac{n}{p}\sin(p\tau),\quad\frac{n}{p}\cos(p\tau)\right]$	9a

where

$$\begin{array}{c|c} \begin{align}\kappa_{1} & =\sqrt{n^{2}p^{2}+\gamma^{2}a^{2}}\\ \kappa_{2} & =\frac{1}{\kappa_{1}}\left(a^{2}+p^{2}\right)\gamma n\\ \kappa_{3} & =\frac{1}{\kappa_{1}}ap \end{align} & \begin{align}a & =\sqrt{\frac{1}{2}\left(\kappa_{1}^{2}-\kappa_{2}^{2}-\kappa_{3}^{2}+r\right)}\\ p & =\sqrt{\frac{1}{2}\left(-\kappa_{1}^{2}+\kappa_{2}^{2}+\kappa_{3}^{2}+r\right)}=\gamma p_{0}\\ n & =\sqrt{\frac{1}{2}\left(\frac{1}{r}\left[\kappa_{1}^{2}+\kappa_{2}^{2}+\kappa_{3}^{2}\right]-1\right)}=\sqrt{\frac{\kappa_{1}^{2}-a^{2}}{p^{2}+a^{2}}}=v\gamma=\sqrt{\gamma^{2}-1}\\ \gamma & =\sqrt{\frac{1}{2}\left(\frac{1}{r}\left[\kappa_{1}^{2}+\kappa_{2}^{2}+\kappa_{3}^{2}\right]+1\right)}=\sqrt{\frac{\kappa_{1}^{2}+p^{2}}{p^{2}+a^{2}}}=\frac{1}{\sqrt{1-v^{2}}}=\sqrt{n^{2}+1}\\ r & =\sqrt{\left(\kappa_{1}^{2}-\kappa_{2}^{2}-\kappa_{3}^{2}\right)^{2}+4\kappa_{1}^{2}\kappa_{3}^{2}}\\ & p_{0}=\frac{p}{\gamma},\quad v=hp_{0}=\frac{n}{\gamma},\quad h=\frac{n}{p},\quad\eta=a\tau,\quad\theta=p\tau=p_{0}t=\gamma p_{0}\tau \end{align} \end{array}$$	9b

with $v$ as tangential velocity, $n$ as proper tangential velocity, $\eta$ as rapidity, $h$ as orbital radius, $p_{0}$ as coordinate angular velocity, $p$ as proper angular velocity, $\theta$ as angle of rotation, $\gamma$ is the Lorentz factor. The Frenet–Serret tetrad is

$$\begin{align}\mathbf{e}_{(0)} & =\left(\gamma\cosh\eta,\ \gamma\sinh\eta,\ -n\sin\theta,\ -n\cos\theta\right)\\
\mathbf{e}_{(1)} & =\frac{1}{\kappa_{1}}\left(\gamma a\sinh\eta,\ \gamma a\cosh\eta,\ -np\cos\theta,\ -np\sin\theta\right)\\
\mathbf{e}_{(2)} & =\left(-n\cosh\eta,\ -n\sinh\eta,\ \gamma\sin\theta,\ -\gamma\cos\theta\right)\\
\mathbf{e}_{(3)} & =\frac{1}{\kappa_{1}}\left(np\sinh\eta,\ np\cosh\eta,\ \gamma a\cos\theta,\ \gamma a\sin\theta\right)
\end{align}$$

The corresponding non-rotating Fermi–Walker tetrad $\mathbf{f}_{(\eta)}$ on the same worldline is as follows: First inserting (9b) into (3a) gives the angular velocity, which together with (9a) can now be inserted into (3b, left), and finally inserted into (3b, right) produces the Fermi–Walker tetrad. The proper coordinates or Fermi coordinates follow by inserting $\mathbf{e}_{(\eta)}$ or $\mathbf{f}_{(\eta)}$ into (4b) (the resulting expressions are not indicated here because of their length).

== Overview of historical formulas ==
In addition to the things described in the previous #History section, the contributions of Herglotz, Kottler, and Møller are described in more detail, since these authors gave extensive classifications of accelerated motion in flat spacetime.

=== Herglotz ===
Herglotz (1909) argued that the metric

$$ds^{2}=d\sigma^{2}+\frac{1}{A_{44}}(d\nu)^{2}$$

where

$$\begin{aligned}d\nu & =A_{14}d\xi_{1}+A_{24}d\xi_{2}+A_{34}d\xi_{3}+A_{44}d\xi_{4}\\
d\sigma^{2} & =\sum_{1}^{3}ij\ A_{ij}d\xi_{i}d\xi_{j}-\frac{1}{A_{44}}\left(A_{14}d\xi_{1}+A_{24}d\xi_{2}+A_{34}d\xi_{3}\right)^{2}
\end{aligned}$$

satisfies the condition of Born rigidity when $\frac{\partial}{\partial\tau}d\sigma^{2}=0$. He pointed out that the motion of a Born rigid body is in general determined by the motion of one of its point (class A), with the exception of those worldlines whose three curvatures are constant, thus representing a helix (class B). For the latter, Herglotz gave the following coordinate transformation corresponding to the trajectories of a family of motions:

(H1) $x_{i}=a_{i}+\sum_{1}^{4}a_{ij}x_{j}^{\prime},\qquad i=1,2,3,4$,

where $a_{i}$ and $a_{ij}$ are functions of proper time $\vartheta$. By differentiation with respect to $\vartheta$, and assuming $x_{i}$ as constant, he obtained

(H2) $\frac{dx_{i}^{\prime}}{d\vartheta}+q_{i}+\sum_{1}^{4}p_{ij}x_{j}^{\prime}=0$

Here, $q_{i}$ represents the four-velocity of the origin $O'$ of $S'$, and $-p_{ij}$ is a six-vector (i.e., an antisymmetric four-tensor of second order, or bivector, having six independent components) representing the angular velocity of $S'$ around $O'$. As any six-vector, it has two invariants:

$$\begin{align}D & =p_{23}p_{14}+p_{31}p_{24}+p_{12}p_{34},\\
\Delta & =p_{23}^{2}+p_{31}^{2}+p_{12}^{2}+p_{14}^{2}+p_{24}^{2}+p_{34}^{2},
\end{align}$$

When $x_{j}^{\prime}$ is constant and $\vartheta$ is variable, any family of motions described by (H1) forms a group and is equivalent to an equidistant family of curves, thus satisfying Born rigidity because they are rigidly connected with $S'$. To derive such a group of motion, (H2) can be integrated with arbitrary constant values of $q_{i}$ and $p_{ij}$. For rotational motions, this results in four groups depending on whether the invariants $D$ or $\Delta$ are zero or not. These groups correspond to four one-parameter groups of Lorentz transformations, which were already derived by Herglotz in a previous section on the assumption, that Lorentz transformations (being rotations in $R_{4}$) correspond to hyperbolic motions in $R_{3}$. The latter have been studied in the 19th century, and were categorized by Felix Klein into loxodromic, elliptic, hyperbolic, and parabolic motions (see also Möbius group).

=== Kottler ===
Friedrich Kottler (1912) followed Herglotz, and derived the same worldlines of constant curvatures using the following Frenet–Serret formulas in four dimensions, with $c^{(\alpha)}$ as comoving tetrad of the worldline, and $\frac{1}{R_{1}},\ \frac{1}{R_{2}},\ \frac{1}{R_{3}}$ as the three curvatures

$${ \begin{matrix}\frac{dc_{1}^{(\alpha)}}{ds}=\\
\frac{dc_{2}^{(\alpha)}}{ds}=\\
\frac{dc_{3}^{(\alpha)}}{ds}=\\
\frac{dc_{4}^{(\alpha)}}{ds}=
\end{matrix}\left.\begin{matrix}* & \frac{c_{2}^{(\alpha)}}{R_{1}} & * & *\\
-\frac{c_{1}^{(\alpha)}}{R_{1}} & * & \frac{c_{3}^{(\alpha)}}{R_{2}} & *\\
* & -\frac{c_{2}^{(\alpha)}}{R_{2}} & * & \frac{c_{4}^{(\alpha)}}{R_{3}}\\
* & * & -\frac{c_{3}^{(\alpha)}}{R_{3}} & *
\end{matrix}\alpha=1,2,3,4\right\} }$$

corresponding to (1). Kottler pointed out that the tetrad can be seen as a reference frame for such worldlines. Then he gave the transformation for the trajectories

$\mathbf{y}=\mathbf{x}+\Gamma^{(1)}c_{1}+\Gamma^{(2)}c_{2}+\Gamma^{(3)}c_{3}+\Gamma^{(4)}c_{4}$ (with ${ h=1,2,3,4}$)

in agreement with (4a). Kottler also defined a tetrad whose basis vectors are fixed in normal space and therefore do not share any rotation. This case was further differentiated into two cases: If the tangent (i.e., the timelike) tetrad field is constant, then the spacelike tetrads fields ${ c_{2}^{(h)},c_{3}^{(h)},c_{4}^{(h)}}$ can be replaced by ${b_{2}^{(h)},b_{3}^{(h)},b_{4}^{(h)}}$ who are "rigidly" connected with the tangent, thus

$${ \mathbf{y}=\mathbf{x}+\eta_{0}^{(1)}c_{1}+\eta_{0}^{(2)}b_{2}+\eta_{0}^{(3)}b_{3}+\eta_{0}^{(4)}b_{4}}$$

The second case is a vector "fixed" in normal space by setting ${ \eta^{(1)}=0}$. Kottler pointed out that this corresponds to class B given by Herglotz (which Kottler calls "Born's body of second kind")

$${ \mathbf{y}=\mathbf{x}+\eta_{0}^{(2)}b_{2}+\eta_{0}^{(3)}b_{3}+\eta_{0}^{(4)}b_{4}}$$,

and class (A) of Herglotz (which Kottler calls "Born's body of first kind") is given by

$${ \mathbf{y}=\mathbf{x}+\Gamma^{(2)}c_{2}+\Gamma^{(3)}c_{3}+\Gamma^{(4)}c_{4}}$$

which both correspond to formula (4b).

In (1914a), Kottler showed that the transformation

$$X=x+\Gamma^{(1)}c_{1}+\Gamma^{(2)}c_{2}+\Gamma^{(3)}c_{3}+\Gamma^{(4)}c_{4}$$,

describes the non-simultaneous coordinates of the points of a body, while the transformation with $\Gamma^{(1)}=0$

$$X=x+\Gamma^{(2)}c_{2}+\Gamma^{(3)}c_{3}+\Gamma^{(4)}c_{4}$$,

describes the simultaneous coordinates of the points of a body. These formulas become "generalized Lorentz transformations" by inserting

$$\Gamma^{(3)}=X',\quad\Gamma^{(4)}=Y',\quad\Gamma^{(2)}=Z',\quad\Gamma^{(1)}=ic(T'-\tau)$$

thus

$$X-x=ic(T'-\tau)c_{1}+Z'c_{2}+X'c_{3}+Y'c_{4}$$

in agreement with (4b). He introduced the terms "proper coordinates" and "proper frame" (German: Eigenkoordinaten, Eigensystem) for a system whose time axis coincides with the respective tangent of the worldline. He also showed that the Born rigid body of second kind, whose worldlines are defined by

$$\mathfrak{X}=x+\Delta^{(2)}c_{2}+\Delta^{(3)}c_{3}+\Delta^{(4)}c_{4}$$,

is particularly suitable for defining a proper frame. Using this formula, he defined the proper frames for hyperbolic motion (free fall) and for uniform circular motion:

Hyperbolic motion	Uniform circular motion	
1914b	1914a	1921
$$\scriptstyle \begin{matrix}\begin{matrix} c_{1}^{(1)}=0, &  & c_{1}^{(2)}=0, &  & c_{1}^{(3)}=\frac{1}{i}\sinh u, &  & c_{1}^{(4)}=\cosh u,\\ c_{2}^{(1)}=0, &  & c_{2}^{(2)}=0, &  & c_{2}^{(3)}=\frac{1}{i}\cosh u, &  & c_{2}^{(4)}=-\sinh u,\\ c_{3}^{(1)}=1, &  & c_{3}^{(2)}=0, &  & c_{3}^{(3)}=0, &  & c_{3}^{(4)}=0,\\ c_{4}^{(1)}=0, &  & c_{4}^{(2)}=1, &  & c_{4}^{(3)}=0, &  & c_{4}^{(4)}=0, \end{matrix}\\ \boldsymbol{\downarrow}\\ X=x+\Delta^{(2)}c_{2}+\Delta^{(3)}c_{3}+\Delta^{(4)}c_{4}\\ \boldsymbol{\downarrow}\\ \begin{align} X & =x_{0}+\mathfrak{X}'\\ Y & =y_{0}+\mathfrak{Y}'\\ Z & =\left(b+\mathfrak{Z}'\right)\cosh\mathfrak{u}\\ cT & =\left(b+\mathfrak{Z}'\right)\sinh\mathfrak{u} \end{align}\\ \left(\Delta^{(2)}=\mathfrak{X}',\ \Delta^{(3)}=\mathfrak{Y}',\ \Delta^{(4)}=\mathfrak{Z}'\right)\\ \boldsymbol{\downarrow}\\ \begin{align} \mathfrak{X}' & =X_{0}-x_{0}+q_{x}T\\ \mathfrak{Y}' & =Y_{0}-y_{0}+q_{y}T\\ b+\mathfrak{Z}' & =\sqrt{\left(Z_{0}+q_{x}T\right)^{2}-c^{2}T^{2}}\\ c\mathfrak{T}' & =b\operatorname{artanh}\frac{cT}{Z_{0}+q_{x}T} \end{align}\\ \left(X=X_{0}+q_{x}T,\ Y=Y_{0}+q_{y}T,\ Z=Z_{0}+q_{x}T\right)\\ \boldsymbol{\downarrow}\\ dS^{2}=(d\mathfrak{X}')^{2}+(d\mathfrak{Y}')^{2}+(d\mathfrak{Z}')^{2}-c^{2}\left(\frac{b+\mathfrak{Z}'}{b^{2}}\right)^{2}(d\mathfrak{T}')^{2} \end{matrix}$$	$$\scriptstyle \begin{matrix}{\begin{matrix} c_{1}^{(h)}=-\frac{a\omega\sin\omega t}{ic\sqrt{1-\frac{a^{2}\omega^{2}}{c^{2}}}},\ \frac{a\omega\cos\omega t}{ic\sqrt{1-\frac{a^{2}\omega^{2}}{c^{2}}}},\ 0,\ \frac{1}{\sqrt{1-\frac{a^{2}\omega^{2}}{c^{2}}}}\\ c_{2}^{(h)}=\cos\omega t,\ \sin\omega t,\ 0\ 0\\ c_{3}^{(h)}=-\frac{\sin\omega t}{\sqrt{1-\frac{a^{2}\omega^{2}}{c^{2}}}},\ \frac{\cos\omega t}{\sqrt{1-\frac{a^{2}\omega^{2}}{c^{2}}}},\ 0,\ \frac{ia\omega}{c\sqrt{1-\frac{a^{2}\omega^{2}}{c^{2}}}}\\ c_{4}^{(h)}=0,\ 0,\ 1,\ 0 \end{matrix}}\\ \boldsymbol{\downarrow}\\ {X^{(h)}=x^{(h)}+\Gamma^{(1)}c_{1}^{(h)}+\Gamma^{(2)}c_{2}^{(h)}+\Gamma^{(3)}c_{3}^{(h)}+\Gamma^{(4)}c_{4}^{(h)}}\\ \boldsymbol{\downarrow}\\ \begin{align} X= & a\cos\omega t-\frac{a\omega(T-t)+\Theta'}{\sqrt{1-\frac{a^{2}\omega^{2}}{c^{2}}}}\sin\omega t+R'\cos\omega t\\ Y= & a\sin\omega t+\frac{a\omega(T-t)+\Theta'}{\sqrt{1-\frac{a^{2}\omega^{2}}{c^{2}}}}\cos\omega t+R'\sin\omega t\\ Z= & z_{0}+Z'\\ icT= & ict+\frac{(T-\tau)+\frac{a\omega}{c^{2}}\Theta'}{\sqrt{1-\frac{a^{2}\omega^{2}}{c^{2}}}} \end{align} \end{matrix}$$	$$\scriptstyle \begin{matrix}\begin{align} X & =(a+x')\cos\omega t-\frac{y'}{\sqrt{1-\frac{a^{2}\omega^{2}}{c^{2}}}}\sin\omega t\\ Y & =(a+x')\sin\omega t+\frac{y'}{\sqrt{1-\frac{a^{2}\omega^{2}}{c^{2}}}}\cos\omega t\\ Z & =b+z'\\ T & =t+\frac{\frac{a\omega}{c^{2}}y'}{\sqrt{1-\frac{a^{2}\omega^{2}}{c^{2}}}}\\ & t'=t\sqrt{1-\frac{a^{2}\omega^{2}}{c^{2}}} \end{align}\\ \boldsymbol{\downarrow}\\ { \begin{align} ds^{2}= & dx^{\prime2}+dy^{\prime2}+dz^{\prime2}-2\frac{\omega y'}{\sqrt{1-\frac{a^{2}\omega^{2}}{c^{2}}}}dx'dt+2\frac{\omega x'}{\sqrt{1-\frac{a^{2}\omega^{2}}{c^{2}}}}dy'dt\\ & +\left(-c^{2}+(a+x')^{2}\omega^{2}+\frac{y^{\prime2}\omega^{2}}{1-\frac{a^{2}\omega^{2}}{c^{2}}}\right)dt^{2} \end{align}} \end{matrix}$$

In (1916a) Kottler gave the general metric for acceleration-relative motions based on the three curvatures

$${ \begin{align}dS^{2}= & d\xi^{\prime2}+d\eta^{\prime2}+d\zeta^{\prime2}-2c\ d\tau'd\xi'\cdot\eta'i/R_{2}+2c\ d\tau'd\eta'\cdot\left(\xi'i/R_{2}-\zeta'i/R_{3}\right)+c\ d\tau'd\zeta'\cdot\eta'i/R_{3}\\
& -c^{2}d\tau^{\prime2}\left[\left(1-\xi'/R_{1}\right)^{2}+\eta^{\prime2}/R_{2}^{2}+\eta^{\prime}/R_{3}^{2}+\left(\xi'/R_{2}-\zeta'/R_{3}\right)^{2}\right]
\end{align}
}$$

In (1916b) he gave it the form:

$${ ds^{2}=dx^{2}+dy^{2}+dz^{2}+2g_{14}dx\ dit+2g_{24}dy\ dit+2g_{34}dz\ dit+g_{44}(dit)^{2}}$$

where ${ g_{14}g_{24}g_{34}g_{44}}$ are free from $t$, and $\frac{\partial g_{i4}}{\partial x_{k}}+\frac{\partial g_{k4}}{\partial x_{i}}=0$, and $\frac{\partial g_{i4}}{\partial x_{k}}-\frac{\partial g_{k4}}{\partial x_{i}}=\text{const.}$, and $\sqrt{g}$ linear in $xyz$.

=== Møller ===
Møller (1952) defined the following transport equation

$$\frac{de_{i}}{d\tau}=\frac{\left(e_{l}\dot{U}_{l}\right)U_{i}-\dot{U}_{i}\left(i_{l}U_{l}\right)}{c^{2}}$$

in agreement with Fermi–Walker transport by (2, without rotation). The Lorentz transformation into a momentary inertial frame was given by him as

$$x_{i}=f_{i}(\tau)+x_{k}^{\prime}\alpha_{ki}(\tau)$$

in agreement with (4a). By setting $x^{i}=x_{l}^{\prime}$, $x_{4}^{\prime}=0$ and $t=\tau$, he obtained the transformation into the "relativistic analogue of a rigid reference frame"

$$X_{i}=f_{i}(t)+x^{\prime\kappa}\alpha_{\kappa i}(\tau)$$

in agreement with the Fermi coordinates (4b), and the metric

$$ds^{2}=dx^{2}+dy^{2}+dz^{2}-c^{2}dt^{2}\left[1+\frac{g_{\kappa}x^{\kappa}}{c^{2}}\right]^{2}$$

in agreement with the Fermi metric (4c) without rotation. He obtained the Fermi–Walker tetrads and Fermi frames of hyperbolic motion and uniform circular motion (some formulas for hyperbolic motion were already derived by him in 1943):

Hyperbolic motion		Uniform circular motion
1943	1952	1952
$${\scriptstyle \begin{matrix}\begin{align}x & =\frac{1}{g}\left\{ \sqrt{(1+gX)^{2}-g^{2}T^{2}}-1\right\} \\ y & =Y\\ z & =Z\\ t & =\frac{1}{2g}\ln\frac{1+gX+gT}{1+gX-gT} \end{align} \\ \boldsymbol{\downarrow}\\ ds^{2}=dx^{2}+dy^{2}+dz^{2}-(1+gx)^{2}dt^{2} \end{matrix}}$$	$$\scriptstyle\begin{matrix}\alpha_{ik}=\left(\begin{matrix}U_{4}/ic & 0 & 0 & iU_{1}/c\\ 0 & 1 & 0 & 0\\ 0 & 0 & 1 & 0\\ U_{1}/ic & 0 & 0 & U_{4}/ic \end{matrix}\right)\\ U_{i}=\left(c\sinh\frac{g\tau}{c},\ 0,0,\ ig\cosh\frac{g\tau}{c}\right)\\ \boldsymbol{\downarrow}\\ X_{i}=\mathbf{f}_{i}(t)+x^{\prime\kappa}\alpha_{\kappa i}(\tau)\\ \boldsymbol{\downarrow}\\ \begin{align} X & =\frac{c^{2}}{g}\left(\cosh\frac{gt}{c}-1\right)+x\cosh\frac{gt}{c}\\ Y & =y\\ Z & =z\\ T & =\frac{c}{g}\sinh\frac{gt}{c}+x\frac{\sinh\frac{gt}{c}}{c} \end{align}\\ \boldsymbol{\downarrow}\\ ds^{2}=dx^{2}+dy^{2}+dz^{2}-c^{2}dt^{2}\left(1+gx/c^{2}\right)^{2}\\ \\ \end{matrix}$$	$$\scriptstyle\begin{matrix}\alpha_{ik}=\left(\begin{matrix}\cos\alpha\cos\beta+\gamma\sin\alpha\sin\beta & \sin\alpha\cos\beta-\gamma\cos\alpha\sin\beta & 0 & -i\frac{u\gamma}{c}\sin\beta\\ \cos\alpha\sin\beta-\gamma\sin\alpha\cos\beta & \sin\alpha\sin\beta+\gamma\cos\alpha\cos\beta & 0 & i\frac{u\gamma}{c}\cos\beta\\ 0 & 0 & 1 & 0\\ i\frac{u\gamma}{c}\sin\alpha & -i\frac{u\gamma}{c}\cos\alpha & 0 & \gamma \end{matrix}\right)\\ { \alpha=\omega\gamma\tau},\ { \beta=\gamma\alpha=\omega\gamma^{2}\tau}. \end{matrix}$$

=== Worldlines of constant curvatures by Herglotz and Kottler ===
General case	Uniform rotation	Catenary	Semicubical parabola	Hyperbolic motion
Herglotz (1909)
loxodromic	elliptic	hyperbolic	parabolic	hyperbolic $\scriptstyle (\alpha=0)$
$$\scriptstyle \begin{matrix}D\ne0\\ p_{21}=-p_{12}=1\\ p_{34}=-p_{43}=i\\ q_{i}=[0,0,0,0] \end{matrix}$$	$$\scriptstyle \begin{matrix}D=0,\ \Delta>0\\ p_{21}=-p_{12}=1\\ \\ q_{i}=[0,0,0,\delta i] \end{matrix}$$	$$\scriptstyle \begin{matrix}D=0,\ \Delta<0\\ p_{34}=-p_{43}=i\\ \\ q_{i}=[\alpha,0,0,0] \end{matrix}$$	$$\scriptstyle \begin{matrix}D=0,\ \Delta=0\\ p_{31}=-p_{13}=1\\ p_{41}=-p_{14}=i\\ q_{i}=[0,\beta,0,\delta i] \end{matrix}$$	
Lorentz-Transformations
$$\scriptstyle \begin{align}x+iy & =(x'+iy')e^{i\lambda\vartheta}\\ x-iy & =(x'-iy')e^{-i\lambda\vartheta}\\ t-z & =(t'-z')e^{\vartheta}\\ t+z & =(t'+z')e^{-\vartheta} \end{align}$$	$$\scriptstyle \begin{align}x+iy & =(x'+iy')e^{i\vartheta}\\ x-iy & =(x'-iy')e^{-i\vartheta}\\ z & =z'\\ t & =t'+\delta\vartheta \end{align}$$	$$\scriptstyle \begin{align}x & =x'+\alpha\vartheta\\ y & =y'\\ t-z & =(t'-z')e^{\vartheta}\\ t+z & =(t'+z')e^{-\vartheta} \end{align}$$	$$\scriptstyle \begin{align}x & =x'+\vartheta(t'-z')+\frac{1}{2}\delta\vartheta^{2}\\ y & =y'+\beta\vartheta\\ z & =z'+\vartheta x'+\frac{1}{2}\vartheta^{2}(t'-z')+\frac{1}{6}\delta\vartheta^{3}\\ t-z & =t'-z'+\delta\vartheta \end{align}$$	$$\scriptstyle \begin{align}x & =x'\\ y & =y'\\ t-z & =(t'-z')e^{\vartheta}\\ t+z & =(t'+z')e^{-\vartheta} \end{align}$$
Trajectories (time)
$$\scriptstyle \begin{align}x+iy & =(x_{0}+iy_{0})e^{i\lambda u}\\ x-iy & =(x_{0}-iy_{0})e^{-i\lambda u}\\ z & =\sqrt{z_{0}^{2}+t^{2}}\\ u & =\lg\frac{\sqrt{z_{0}^{2}+t^{2}}-t}{z_{0}} \end{align}$$	$$\scriptstyle \begin{align}x+iy & =(x_{0}+iy_{0})e^{i\frac{t}{\delta}}\\ x-iy & =(x_{0}-iy_{0})e^{-i\frac{t}{\delta}}\\ z & =z_{0} \end{align}$$	$$\scriptstyle \begin{align}x & =x_{0}+\alpha\lg\frac{\sqrt{z_{0}^{2}+t^{2}}-t}{z_{0}}\\ y & =y_{0}\\ z & =\sqrt{z_{0}^{2}+t^{2}} \end{align}$$	$$\scriptstyle \begin{align}x & =x_{0}+\frac{1}{2}\delta\vartheta^{2}\\ y & =y_{0}+\beta\vartheta\\ z & =z_{0}+x_{0}\vartheta+\frac{1}{6}\delta\vartheta^{3}\\ t-z & =\delta\vartheta \end{align}$$	$$\scriptstyle \begin{align}x & =x_{0}\\ y & =y_{0}\\ z & =\sqrt{z_{0}^{2}+t^{2}} \end{align}$$
Kottler (1912, 1914)
hyperspherical curve	uniform rotation	catenary	cubic curve	hyperbolic motion
Curvatures
$$\scriptstyle \begin{align}\left(\frac{1}{R_{1}}\right)^{2} & =\frac{a^{2}\lambda^{4}+b^{2}}{\left(b^{2}-a^{2}\lambda^{2}\right)^{2}}\\ \left(\frac{1}{R_{2}}\right)^{2} & =-\frac{a^{2}b^{2}\lambda^{2}\left(1+\lambda^{2}\right)}{\left(b^{2}-a^{2}\lambda^{2}\right)^{2}\left(a^{2}\lambda^{4}+b^{2}\right)}\\ \left(\frac{1}{R_{3}}\right)^{2} & =-\frac{\lambda^{2}}{a^{2}\lambda^{4}+b^{2}} \end{align}$$	$$\scriptstyle \begin{align}\left(\frac{1}{R_{1}}\right)^{2} & =\frac{a^{2}\lambda^{4}}{\left(1-a^{2}\lambda^{2}\right)^{2}}\\ \left(\frac{1}{R_{2}}\right)^{2} & =-\frac{\lambda^{2}}{\left(1-a^{2}\lambda^{2}\right)^{2}}\\ \left(\frac{1}{R_{3}}\right)^{2} & =0 \end{align}$$	$$\scriptstyle \begin{align}\left(\frac{1}{R_{1}}\right)^{2} & =\frac{b^{2}}{\left(b^{2}-\alpha^{2}\right)^{2}}\\ \left(\frac{1}{R_{2}}\right)^{2} & =-\frac{\alpha^{2}}{\left(b^{2}-\alpha^{2}\right)^{2}}\\ \left(\frac{1}{R_{3}}\right)^{2} & =0 \end{align}$$	$$\scriptstyle \begin{align}\left(\frac{1}{R_{1}}\right)^{2} & =\frac{\alpha^{2}}{\left(\alpha^{2}+2x_{0}^{(1)}\right)^{2}}\\ \left(\frac{1}{R_{2}}\right)^{2} & =-\frac{\alpha^{2}}{\left(\alpha^{2}+2x_{0}^{(1)}\right)^{2}}=-\left(\frac{1}{R_{1}}\right)^{2}\\ \left(\frac{1}{R_{3}}\right)^{2} & =0 \end{align}$$	$$\scriptstyle \begin{align}\left(\frac{1}{R_{1}}\right)^{2} & =\frac{1}{b^{2}}\\ \left(\frac{1}{R_{2}}\right)^{2} & =0\\ \left(\frac{1}{R_{3}}\right)^{2} & =0 \end{align}$$
Trajectory of $\scriptstyle S_4$
$$\scriptstyle \begin{align}x^{(1)} & =a\cos\lambda\left(u-u_{0}\right)\\ x^{(2)} & =a\sin\lambda\left(u-u_{0}\right)\\ x^{(3)} & =b\cos iu\\ x^{(4)} & =b\sin iu \end{align}$$	$$\scriptstyle \begin{align}x^{(1)} & =a\cos\lambda\left(u-u_{0}\right)\\ x^{(2)} & =a\sin\lambda\left(u-u_{0}\right)\\ x^{(3)} & =x_{0}^{(3)}\\ x^{(4)} & =iu \end{align}$$	$$\scriptstyle \begin{align}x^{(1)} & =x_{0}^{(1)}+\alpha u\\ x^{(2)} & =x_{0}^{(2)}\\ x^{(3)} & =b\cos iu\\ x^{(4)} & =b\sin iu \end{align}$$	$$\scriptstyle \begin{align}x^{(1)} & =x_{0}^{(1)}+\frac{1}{2}\alpha u^{2}\\ x^{(2)} & =x_{0}^{(2)}\\ x^{(3)} & =x_{0}^{(3)}+x_{0}^{(1)}u+\frac{1}{6}\alpha u^{3}\\ x^{(4)} & =i\left(x_{0}^{(3)}+x_{0}^{(1)}u+\frac{1}{6}\alpha u^{2}\right)+i\alpha u \end{align}$$	$$\scriptstyle \begin{align}x^{(1)} & =x_{0}^{(1)}\\ x^{(2)} & =x_{0}^{(2)}\\ x^{(3)} & =b\cos iu\\ x^{(4)} & =b\sin iu \end{align}$$
Trajectory (time)
$$\scriptstyle \begin{align}x & =a\cos\lambda\left(u-u_{0}\right)\\ y & =a\sin\lambda\left(u-u_{0}\right)\\ z & =\sqrt{b^{2}+c^{2}t^{2}}\\ u & =\ln\frac{-ct+\sqrt{b^{2}+c^{2}t^{2}}}{b} \end{align}$$	$$\scriptstyle \begin{align}x & =a\cos\omega_{z}\left(t-t_{0}\right)\\ y & =a\sin\omega_{z}\left(t-t_{0}\right)\\ z & =z_{0} \end{align}$$	$$\scriptstyle \begin{align}x & =x_{0}+\alpha\ln\frac{-ct+\sqrt{b^{2}+c^{2}t^{2}}}{b}\\ y & =y_{0}\\ z & =\sqrt{b^{2}+c^{2}t^{2}} \end{align}$$	$$\scriptstyle \begin{align}x & =x_{0}+\frac{1}{2}\alpha u^{2}\\ y & =y_{0}\\ z & =z_{0}+x_{0}u+\frac{1}{6}\alpha u^{3}\\ ct & =z_{0}+x_{0}u+\frac{1}{6}\alpha u^{3}+\alpha u\\ & =z+\alpha u \end{align}$$	$$\scriptstyle \begin{align}x & =x_{0}\\ y & =y_{0}\\ z & =\sqrt{b^{2}+c^{2}t^{2}} \end{align}$$

== Bibliography ==
=== Textbooks ===
- von Laue, M. (1921). Die Relativitätstheorie, Band 1 (fourth edition of "Das Relativitätsprinzip" ed.). Vieweg.; First edition 1911, second expanded edition 1913, third expanded edition 1919.
- Pauli, W. (1921). "Die Relativitätstheorie". Encyclopädie der mathematischen Wissenschaften. Vol. 5. Leipzig, B.G. Teubner. pp. 539–776. New edition 2013: Editor: Domenico Giulini, Springer, 2013 ISBN 3642583555.
- Møller, C. (1955) [1952]. The theory of relativity. Oxford Clarendon Press.
- Synge, J.L. (1960). Relativity: the general theory. North-Holland.
- Misner, C. W., Thorne, K. S., and Wheeler, J. A (1973). Gravitation. Freeman. ISBN 978-0-7167-0344-0.
- Rindler, W. (1977). Essential Relativity. Springer. ISBN 978-3-540-07970-5.
- Johns, O. (2005). Analytical Mechanics for Relativity and Quantum Mechanics. OUP Oxford. ISBN 978-0-19-856726-4.
- Koks, D. (2006). Explorations in Mathematical Physics. Springer. ISBN 978-0-387-30943-9.
- T. Padmanabhan (2010). Gravitation: Foundations and Frontiers. Cambridge University Press. ISBN 978-1-139-48539-5.
- Kopeikin, S., Efroimsky, M., Kaplan, G. (2011). Relativistic Celestial Mechanics of the Solar System. John Wiley & Sons. ISBN 978-3-527-40856-6.
- Gourgoulhon, E. (2013). Special Relativity in General Frames: From Particles to Astrophysics. Springer. ISBN 978-3-642-37276-6.

=== Journal articles ===
- Bel, L. (1994). "Born's group and Generalized isometries". In J. Diaz, M. Lorente (ed.). Relativity in General. Atlantica Séguier Frontières. p. 47. arXiv:1103.2509. Bibcode:2011arXiv1103.2509B. ISBN 978-2-86332-168-3.
- Bini, D., & Jantzen, R. T. (2003). "Circular holonomy, clock effects and gravitoelectromagnetism: Still going around in circles after all these years". In R. Ruffini and C. Sigismondi (ed.). Proceedings of the Ninth ICRA Network Workshop on Fermi and Astrophysics. Vol. 117. pp. 983–1008. arXiv:gr-qc/0202085. Bibcode:2002NCimB.117..983B.
- Bini, D., & Jantzen, R. T. (2004). "Inertial Forces: The Special Relativistic Assessment" (PDF). Relativity in Rotating Frames. Springer. pp. 221–239. doi:10.1007/978-94-017-0528-8_13. ISBN 978-90-481-6514-8.
- Bini, D., Cherubini, C., Geralico, A., & Jantzen, R. T. (2008). "Physical frames along circular orbits in stationary axisymmetric spacetimes". General Relativity and Gravitation. 40 (5): 985–1012. arXiv:1408.4598. Bibcode:2008GReGr..40..985B. doi:10.1007/s10714-007-0587-z. S2CID 118540815.
- Formiga, J. B., & Romero, C. (2006). "On the differential geometry of time-like curves in Minkowski spacetime". American Journal of Physics. 74 (11): 1012–1016. arXiv:gr-qc/0601002. Bibcode:2006AmJPh..74.1012F. doi:10.1119/1.2232644. S2CID 18892394.
- Giulini, Domenico (2008). "The Rich Structure of Minkowski Space". Minkowski Spacetime: A Hundred Years Later. Vol. 165. Springer. p. 83. arXiv:0802.4345. Bibcode:2008arXiv0802.4345G. ISBN 978-90-481-3474-8.
- Hehl, F. W., Lemke, J., & Mielke, E. W. (1991). "Two Lectures on Fermions and Gravity". Geometry and Theoretical Physics. Springer. pp. 56–140. doi:10.1007/978-3-642-76353-3_3. ISBN 978-3-642-76355-7.
- Irvine, W. M. (1964). "Electrodynamics in a rotating system of reference". Physica. 30 (6): 1160–1170. Bibcode:1964Phy....30.1160I. doi:10.1016/0031-8914(64)90106-5.
- Iyer, B. R., & Vishveshwara, C. V. (1993). "Frenet-Serret description of gyroscopic precession". Physical Review D. 48 (12): 5706–5720. arXiv:gr-qc/9310019. Bibcode:1993PhRvD..48.5706I. doi:10.1103/PhysRevD.48.5706. PMID 10016237. S2CID 119458843.
- Kajari, E., Buser, M., Feiler, C., & Schleich, W. P. (2009). "Rotation in relativity and the propagation of light". Proceedings of the International School of Physics "Enrico Fermi". Course CLXVIII (Atom Optics and Space Physics): 45–148. arXiv:0905.0765. doi:10.3254/978-1-58603-990-5-45. S2CID 119187725.
- Letaw, J. R. (1981). "Stationary world lines and the vacuum excitation of noninertial detectors". Physical Review D. 23 (8): 1709–1714. Bibcode:1981PhRvD..23.1709L. doi:10.1103/PhysRevD.23.1709.
- Letaw, J. R., & Pfautsch, J. D. (1982). "The stationary coordinate systems in flat spacetime". Journal of Mathematical Physics. 23 (3): 425–431. Bibcode:1982JMP....23..425L. doi:10.1063/1.525364.
- Maluf, J. W., & Faria, F. F. (2008). "On the construction of Fermi-Walker transported frames". Annalen der Physik. 17 (5): 326–335. arXiv:0804.2502. Bibcode:2008AnP...520..326M. doi:10.1002/andp.200810289. S2CID 14389237.
- Marzlin, K. P. (1994). "The physical meaning of Fermi coordinates". General Relativity and Gravitation. 26 (6): 619–636. arXiv:gr-qc/9402010. Bibcode:1994GReGr..26..619M. doi:10.1007/BF02108003. S2CID 17918026.
- Mashhoon, B. (1990). "The hypothesis of locality in relativistic physics". Physics Letters A. 145 (4): 147–153. Bibcode:1990PhLA..145..147M. doi:10.1016/0375-9601(90)90670-J.
- Mashhoon, B., & Muench, U. (2002). "Length measurement in accelerated systems". Annalen der Physik. 11 (7): 532–547. arXiv:gr-qc/0206082. Bibcode:2002AnP...514..532M. doi:10.1002/1521-3889(200208)11:7<532::AID-ANDP532>3.0.CO;2-3.
- Mashhoon, B. (2004) [2004]. "The Hypothesis of Locality and Its Limitations". Relativity in Rotating Frames. Springer. pp. 43–55. arXiv:gr-qc/0303029. doi:10.1007/978-94-017-0528-8_5. ISBN 978-90-481-6514-8. S2CID 9502229.
- Møller, C. (1943). "On homogeneous gravitational fields in the general theory of relativity and the clock paradox". Dan. Mat. Fys. Medd. 8: 3–25.
- Ni, W. T., & Zimmermann, M. (1978). "Inertial and gravitational effects in the proper reference frame of an accelerated, rotating observer". Physical Review D. 17 (6): 1473–1476. Bibcode:1978PhRvD..17.1473N. doi:10.1103/PhysRevD.17.1473.
- Nikolić, H. (2000). "Relativistic contraction and related effects in noninertial frames". Physical Review A. 61 (3) 032109. arXiv:gr-qc/9904078. Bibcode:2000PhRvA..61c2109N. doi:10.1103/PhysRevA.61.032109. S2CID 5783649.
- Pauri, M., & Vallisneri, M. (2000). "Märzke-Wheeler coordinates for accelerated observers in special relativity". Foundations of Physics Letters. 13 (5): 401–425. arXiv:gr-qc/0006095. Bibcode:2000gr.qc.....6095P. doi:10.1023/A:1007861914639. S2CID 15097773.
- Romain, J. E. (1963). "Time measurements in accelerated frames of reference". Reviews of Modern Physics. 35 (2): 376–388. Bibcode:1963RvMP...35..376R. doi:10.1103/RevModPhys.35.376.
- Synge, J. L. (1966). "Timelike helices in flat space-time". Proceedings of the Royal Irish Academy, Section A. 65: 27–42. JSTOR 20488646.
- Voytik, V. V. (2011). "The general form-invariance principle". Gravitation and Cosmology. 17 (3): 218–223. arXiv:1105.6044. Bibcode:2011GrCo...17..218V. doi:10.1134/S0202289311030108. S2CID 119281266.
