= Friedrich Kottler =

Austrian physicist (1886–1965)

Friedrich Kottler (December 10, 1886 – May 11, 1965) was an Austrian theoretical physicist. He was a Privatdozent before he got a professorship in 1923 at the University of Vienna.

== Life ==
In 1938, after the Anschluss, he lost his professorship due to his Jewish ancestry. With the help of Albert Einstein and Wolfgang Pauli, he immigrated to America from his hometown of Vienna, Austria, settling in Rochester, New York, where he worked at the Eastman Kodak Research Laboratory. He died in Rochester, New York in 1965. Besides optics, Kottler's professional pursuits focused on the theory of relativity.

== Contributions to relativity ==
- In (1912), he presented a general covariant formulation of Maxwell's equations, based on the absolute differential calculus, which is also valid within Albert Einstein's General Relativity, before that theory was even developed. In relation to this, Einstein & Marcel Grossmann gave credit to Kottler in 1913.
- In (1912, 1914a, 1914b, 1916a, 1916b, 1918, 1921) Kottler worked on the description of accelerations and rotations in flat Minkowski space, using four-dimensional Frenet-Serret formulas and the corresponding orthonormal tetrads, and formulated the proper reference frames for worldlines of constant curvatures given by Gustav Herglotz in 1909, in particular for hyperbolic motion (Kottler-Møller metric) and uniform circular motion. In (1916a), he also discussed the conformal spacetime transformations (related to the spherical wave transformation by Harry Bateman and Ebenezer Cunningham in 1909) as an alternative way to introduce accelerated frames.
- In (1916b) he criticized the role of the equivalence principle in general relativity, which prompted a reply by Einstein in the same year.
- In (1918) he formulated the Kottler metric or Kottler spacetime (which has been described as "the only spherically symmetric solution of the Einstein vacuum field equations with a cosmological constant" and whose special cases include the de Sitter-Schwarzschild metric), as well as the Kottler-Whittaker metric for a homogeneous gravitational field in flat spacetime.
- In (1922a, 1922b) he argued that one can formulate Maxwell's equations and Newton's law of gravitation independently of any metric.
- In (1922c) he published the article "Gravitation und Relativitätstheorie" in Band 6 of Klein's encyclopedia.
- In (1924a, 1924b) he analyzed the history of special relativity, focusing on the contributions of Augustin-Jean Fresnel, Hendrik Lorentz, Henri Poincaré and Einstein.

== Published works ==
- 1912: Über die Raumzeitlinien der Minkowski'schen Welt, Wiener Sitzungsberichte 2a, 121: 1659–1759. (English Wikisource translation: On the spacetime lines of a Minkowski world)
- 1914a: Relativitätsprinzip und beschleunigte Bewegung, Annalen der Physik 349 (13), 701-748
- 1914b: Fallende Bezugssysteme vom Standpunkte des Relativitätsprinzips, Annalen der Physik 349 (13), 701-748
- 1916a: Beschleunigungsrelative Bewegungen und die konforme Gruppe der Minkowski'schen Welt, Wiener Sitzungsberichte 2a, 125, 899-919
- 1916b: Über Einsteins Äquivalenzhypothese und die Gravitation, Annalen der Physik 355 (16), 955-972
- 1918: Über die physikalischen Grundlagen der Einsteinschen Relativitätstheorie, Annalen der Physik, 4. Folge, Bd.60, S.401-461
- 1921: Rotierende Bezugssysteme in einer Minkowskischen Welt, Physikalische Zeitschrift 22, 274-280 & 480-484
- 1922a: Newtonsches Gesetz und Metrik, Wiener Sitzungsberichte 2a, 131: 1-14. (English translation by David Delphenich: Newton's laws and metrics)
- 1922b: Maxwellsche Gleichungen und Metrik, Wiener Sitzungsberichte 2a, 131: 119-146 (English translation by David Delphenich: Maxwell’s equations and metrics)
- 1922c, Gravitation und Relativitätstheorie, Encyklopädie der mathematischen Wissenschaften mit Einschluss ihrer Anwendungen, 6.2.2, 159-237
- 1923, Zur Theorie der Beugung an schwarzen Schirmen (On the theory of diffraction at black screens), Annalen der Physik, 375 (6): 405–56.
- 1924a, Considerations de critique historique sur la theorie de la relativite. Partie 1: De Fresnel à Lorentz, Scientia, 36, pp. 231–242
- 1924b, Considerations de critique historique sur la theorie de la relativite. Partie 2: Henri Poincaré et Albert Einstein, Scientia, 36, pp. 301–316
