= Hyperbolic motion (relativity) =

Motion of an object with constant proper acceleration in special relativity

Hyperbolic motion can be visualized on a Minkowski diagram, where the motion of the accelerating particle is along the $X$-axis. Each hyperbola is defined by $x=\pm c^2/\alpha$ and $\eta=\alpha\tau/c$ (with $c=1, \alpha=1$) in equation (2).

Hyperbolic motion is the motion of an object with constant proper acceleration in special relativity. It is called hyperbolic motion because the equation describing the path of the object through spacetime is a hyperbola. It can be visualized when graphed on a Minkowski diagram, whose position coordinate represents a suitable inertial frame. This type of motion has several interesting features, among them that it is possible to outrun a photon if given a sufficient head start, as may be concluded from the diagram.

== History ==
Hermann Minkowski (1908) showed the relation between a point on a worldline and the magnitude of four-acceleration and a "curvature hyperbola" (German: Krümmungshyperbel). In the context of Born rigidity, Max Born (1909) subsequently coined the term "hyperbolic motion" (German: Hyperbelbewegung) for the case of constant magnitude of four-acceleration, then provided a detailed description for charged particles in hyperbolic motion, and introduced the corresponding "hyperbolically accelerated reference system" (German: hyperbolisch beschleunigtes Bezugsystem). Born's formulas were simplified and extended by Arnold Sommerfeld (1910). For early reviews see the textbooks by Max von Laue (1911, 1921) or Wolfgang Pauli (1921). See also Galeriu (2015) or Gourgoulhon (2013), and Acceleration (special relativity)#History.

== Worldline ==
The proper acceleration $\alpha$ of a particle is defined as the acceleration that a particle "feels" as it accelerates from one inertial reference frame to another. If the proper acceleration is directed parallel to the line of motion, it is related to the ordinary three-acceleration in special relativity $a=du/dT$ by

$$\alpha=\gamma^3 a=\frac{1}{\left(1-u^2/c^2\right)^{3/2}}\frac{du}{dT},$$

where $u$ is the instantaneous speed of the particle, $\gamma$ the Lorentz factor, $c$ is the speed of light, and $T$ is the coordinate time. Solving for the equation of motion gives the desired formulas, which can be expressed in terms of coordinate time $T$ as well as proper time $\tau$. For simplification, all initial values for time, location, and velocity can be set to 0, thus:

$$\begin{array}{c|c} \begin{align}u(T) & =\frac{\alpha T}{\sqrt{1+\left(\frac{\alpha T}{c}\right)^{2}}}\\ & =c\tanh\left(\operatorname{arsinh}\frac{\alpha T}{c}\right)\\ X(T) & =\frac{c^{2}}{\alpha}\left(\sqrt{1+\left(\frac{\alpha T}{c}\right)^{2}}-1\right)\\ & =\frac{c^{2}}{\alpha}\left(\cosh\left(\operatorname{arsinh}\frac{\alpha T}{c}\right)-1\right)\\ c\tau(T) & =\frac{c^{2}}{\alpha}\ln\left(\sqrt{1+\left(\frac{\alpha T}{c}\right)^{2}}+\frac{\alpha T}{c}\right)\\ & =\frac{c^{2}}{\alpha}\operatorname{arsinh}\frac{\alpha T}{c} \end{align} & \begin{align}u(\tau) & =c\tanh\frac{\alpha\tau}{c}\\ \\ X(\tau) & =\frac{c^{2}}{\alpha}\left(\cosh\frac{\alpha\tau}{c}-1\right)\\ \\ cT(\tau) & =\frac{c^{2}}{\alpha}\sinh\frac{\alpha\tau}{c}\\ \\ \\ \end{align} \end{array}$$	1

This gives $\left(X+c^{2}/\alpha\right)^{2}-c^{2}T^{2}=c^{4}/\alpha^{2}$, which is a hyperbola in time T and the spatial location variable $X$. In this case, the accelerated object is located at $X=0$ at time $T=0$. If instead there are initial values different from zero, the formulas for hyperbolic motion assume the form:

$${\scriptstyle \begin{array}{c|c}
\begin{align}u(T) & =\frac{u_{0}\gamma_{0}+\alpha T}{\sqrt{1+\left(\frac{u_{0}\gamma_{0}+\alpha T}{c}\right)^{2}}}\quad\\
& =c\tanh\left\{ \operatorname{arsinh}\left(\frac{u_{0}\gamma_{0}+\alpha T}{c}\right)\right\} \\
X(T) & =X_{0}+\frac{c^{2}}{\alpha}\left(\sqrt{1+\left(\frac{u_{0}\gamma_{0}+\alpha T}{c}\right)^{2}}-\gamma_{0}\right)\\
& =X_{0}+\frac{c^{2}}{\alpha}\left\{ \cosh\left[\operatorname{arsinh}\left(\frac{u_{0}\gamma_{0}+\alpha T}{c}\right)\right]-\gamma_{0}\right\} \\
c\tau(T) & =c\tau_{0}+\frac{c^{2}}{\alpha}\ln\left(\frac{\sqrt{c^{2}+\left(u_{0}\gamma_{0}+\alpha T\right){}^{2}}+u_{0}\gamma_{0}+\alpha T}{\left(c+u_{0}\right)\gamma_{0}}\right)\\
& =c\tau_{0}+\frac{c^{2}}{\alpha}\left\{ \operatorname{arsinh}\left(\frac{u_{0}\gamma_{0}+\alpha T}{c}\right)-\operatorname{artanh}\left(\frac{u_{0}}{c}\right)\right\}
\end{align}
& \begin{align}u(\tau) & =c\tanh\left\{ \operatorname{artanh}\left(\frac{u_{0}}{c}\right)+\frac{\alpha\tau}{c}\right\} \\
\\
X(\tau) & =X_{0}+\frac{c^{2}}{\alpha}\left\{ \cosh\left[\operatorname{artanh}\left(\frac{u_{0}}{c}\right)+\frac{\alpha\tau}{c}\right]-\gamma_{0}\right\} \\
\\
cT(\tau) & =cT_{0}+\frac{c^{2}}{\alpha}\left\{ \sinh\left[\operatorname{artanh}\left(\frac{u_{0}}{c}\right)+\frac{\alpha\tau}{c}\right]-\frac{u_{0}\gamma_{0}}{c}\right\}
\end{align}
\end{array}}$$

== Rapidity ==
The worldline for hyperbolic motion (which from now on will be written as a function of proper time) can be simplified in several ways. For instance, the expression

$$X=\frac{c^{2}}{\alpha}\left(\cosh\frac{\alpha\tau}{c}-1\right)$$

can be subjected to a spatial shift of amount $c^2/\alpha$, thus

$X=\frac{c^{2}}{\alpha}\cosh\frac{\alpha\tau}{c}$,

by which the observer is at position $X=c^2/\alpha$ at time $T=0$. Furthermore, by setting $x=c^2/\alpha$ and introducing the rapidity $\eta=\operatorname{artanh}\frac{u}{c}=\frac{\alpha\tau}{c}$, the equations for hyperbolic motion reduce to

$cT=x\sinh\eta,\quad X=x\cosh\eta$	2

with the hyperbola $X^{2}-c^{2}T^{2}=x^{2}$.

== Charged particles in hyperbolic motion ==
Born (1909), Sommerfeld (1910), von Laue (1911), Pauli (1921) also formulated the equations for the electromagnetic field of charged particles in hyperbolic motion. This was extended by Hermann Bondi & Thomas Gold (1955) and Fulton & Rohrlich (1960)

$$\begin{align}E_{\rho'}'= & \frac{\left(8e/\alpha^{2}\right)\rho'z'}{\xi^{\prime3}}\\
E_{z'}'= & \frac{-\left(4e/\alpha^{2}\right)1/\alpha^{2}+t^{\prime2}+\rho^{\prime2}-z^{\prime2}}{\xi^{\prime3}}\\
E_{\varphi'}'= & H_{\varphi'}'=H_{z'}'=0\\
H_{\varphi'}'= & \frac{\left(8e/\alpha^{2}\right)\rho't'}{\xi^{\prime3}}\\
\xi'= & \sqrt{\left(1/\alpha^{2}+t^{\prime2}-\rho^{\prime2}-z^{\prime2}\right)^{2}+\left(2\rho'/\alpha\right)^{2}}
\end{align}$$

This is related to the controversially discussed question, whether charges in perpetual hyperbolic motion do radiate or not, and whether this is consistent with the equivalence principle – even though it is about an ideal situation, because perpetual hyperbolic motion is not possible. While early authors such as Born (1909) or Pauli (1921) argued that no radiation arises, later authors such as Bondi & Gold and Fulton & Rohrlich showed that radiation does indeed arise.

== Proper reference frame ==
The light path through E marks the apparent event horizon of an observer P in hyperbolic motion.

In equation (2) for hyperbolic motion, the expression $x$ was constant, whereas the rapidity $\eta$ was variable. However, as pointed out by Sommerfeld, one can define $x$ as a variable, while making $\eta$ constant. This means, that the equations become transformations indicating the simultaneous rest shape of an accelerated body with hyperbolic coordinates $(x,y,z,\eta)$ as seen by a comoving observer

$$cT=x\sinh\eta,\quad X=x\cosh\eta,\quad Y=y,\quad Z=z$$

By means of this transformation, the proper time becomes the time of the hyperbolically accelerated frame. These coordinates, which are commonly called Rindler coordinates (similar variants are called Kottler-Møller coordinates or Lass coordinates), can be seen as a special case of Fermi coordinates or Proper coordinates, and are often used in connection with the Unruh effect. Using these coordinates, it turns out that observers in hyperbolic motion possess an apparent event horizon, beyond which no signal can reach them.

== Special conformal transformation ==
A lesser known method for defining a reference frame in hyperbolic motion is the employment of the special conformal transformation, consisting of an inversion, a translation, and another inversion. It is commonly interpreted as a gauge transformation in Minkowski space, though some authors alternatively use it as an acceleration transformation (see Kastrup for a critical historical survey). It has the form

$$X^{\mu}=\frac{x^{\mu}-a^{\mu}x^{2}}{1-2ax+a^{2}x^{2}}$$

Using only one spatial dimension by $x^{\mu}=(t,x)$, and further simplifying by setting $x=0$, and using the acceleration $a^{\mu}=(0,-\alpha/2)$, it follows

$$T=\frac{t}{1-\frac{1}{4}\alpha{}^{2}t^{2}},\quad X=\frac{-\alpha t^{2}}{2\left(1-\frac{1}{4}\alpha{}^{2}t^{2}\right)}$$

with the hyperbola $\left(X-1/\alpha\right)^{2}-T^{2}=1/\alpha^{2}$. It turns out that at $t=\pm(x+2/\alpha)$ the time becomes singular, to which Fulton & Rohrlich & Witten remark that one has to stay away from this limit, while Kastrup (who is very critical of the acceleration interpretation) remarks that this is one of the strange results of this interpretation.
