= Christian Møller =

Danish chemist and physicist (1904–1980)

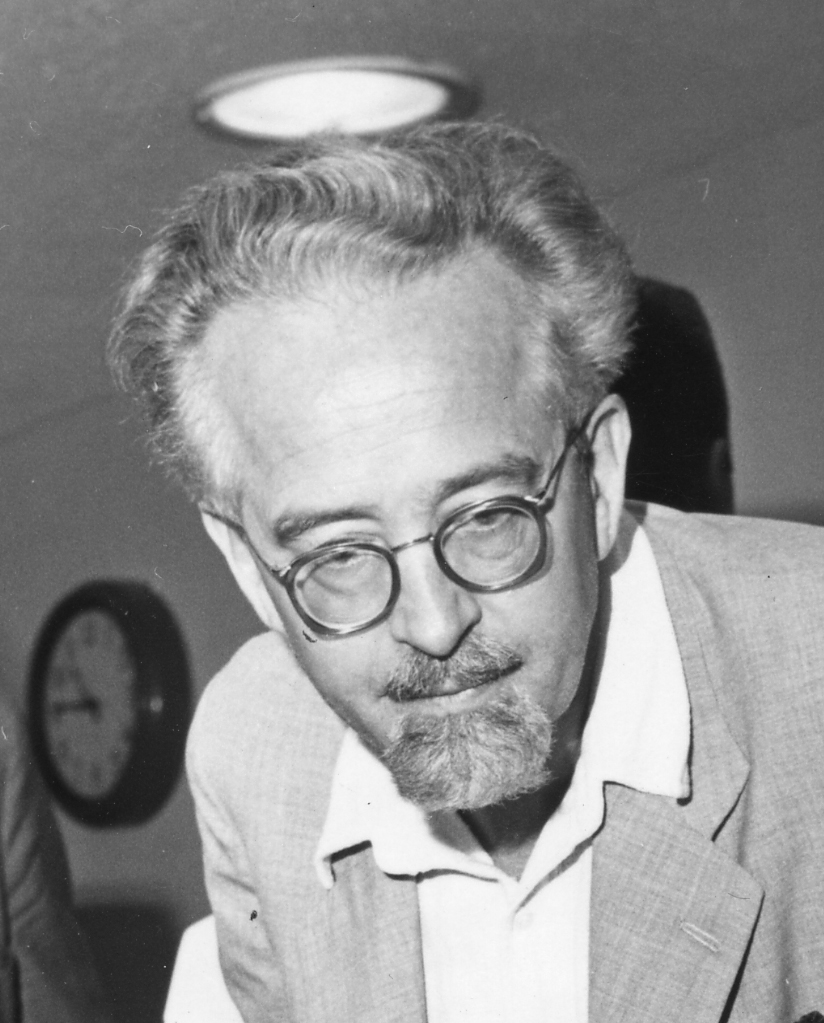
- Møller in 1957
- Born: 22 December 1904; Hundslev, Als, Denmark
- Died: 14 January 1980 (aged 75); Ordrup, Denmark
- Known for: Møller scattering Møller tetrad theory of gravitation Møller velocity Møller–Plesset perturbation theory Kottler–Møller coordinates
- Awards: Ørsted Medal (1970)
- Scientific career
- Fields: Theoretical physics

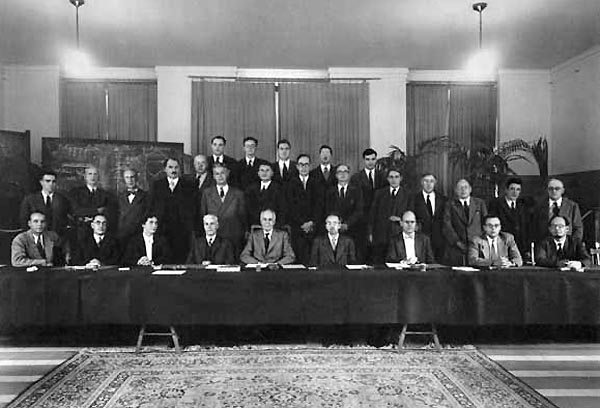
Solvay Conference on Physics in Brussels 1951. Left to right, sitting: Crussaro, Allen, Cauchois, Borelius, Bragg, Møller, Sietz, Hollomon, Frank; middle row: Gerhart Rathenau, Koster, Erik Rudberg, Flamache, Goche, Groven, Orowan, Burgers, Shockley, Guinier, C.S. Smith, Dehlinger, Laval, Henriot; top row: Gaspart, Lomer, Cottrell, Homes, Curien

Christian Møller (22 December 1904, 14 January 1980) was a Danish chemist and physicist who made fundamental contributions to the theory of relativity, theory of gravitation and quantum chemistry. He is known for Møller–Plesset perturbation theory and Møller scattering.

His suggestion in 1938 to Otto Frisch that the newly discovered process of nuclear fission might create surplus energy, led Frisch to conceive of the concept of the nuclear chain reaction, leading to the Frisch–Peierls memorandum, which kick-started the development of nuclear energy through the MAUD Committee and the Manhattan Project.

Møller was the director of the European Organization for Nuclear Research (CERN)'s Theoretical Study Group between 1954 and 1957 and later a member of the same organization's Scientific Policy Committee (1959–1972).

== Møller tetrad theory of gravitation ==
In 1961, Møller showed that a tetrad description of gravitational fields allows a more rational treatment of the energy–momentum complex than in a theory based on the metric tensor alone. The advantage of using tetrads as gravitational variables was connected with the fact that this allowed to construct expressions for the energy-momentum complex which had more satisfactory transformation properties than in a purely metric formulation.

== Books ==
- The world and the atom, London, 1940.
- The theory of relativity, Clarendon Press, Oxford, 1972.
- A study in gravitational collapse. Munksgaard. 1975. Archived from the original on December 18, 2014.
- On the crisis in the theory of gravitation and a possible solution, Kobenhavn : Munksgaard, 1978.
- Evidence for gravitational theories (ed.), Academic Press, 1963.
- Interview with Dr. Christian Moller by Thomas S. Kuhn at Copenhagen July 29, 1963 Oral History Transcript — Dr. Christian Moller

== See also ==
- Born rigidity
- Proper reference frame (flat spacetime)
- Chandrasekhar–Eddington dispute
