= Fermi coordinates =

Local coordinates that are adapted to a geodesic

In the mathematical theory of Riemannian geometry, there are two uses of the term Fermi coordinates. In one use they are local coordinates that are adapted to a geodesic. In a second, more general one, they are local coordinates that are adapted to any world line, even not geodesical.

Take a future-directed timelike curve $\gamma=\gamma(\tau)$, $\tau$ being the proper time along $\gamma$ in the spacetime $M$. Assume that $p=\gamma(0)$ is the initial point of $\gamma$. Fermi coordinates adapted to $\gamma$ are constructed this way. Consider an orthonormal basis of $TM$ with $e_0$ parallel to $\dot\gamma$. Transport the basis $\{e_a\}_{a=0,1,2,3}$along $\gamma(\tau)$ making use of Fermi–Walker's transport. The basis $\{e_a(\tau)\}_{a=0,1,2,3}$ at each point $\gamma(\tau)$ is still orthonormal with $e_0(\tau)$ parallel to $\dot\gamma$ and is non-rotated (in a precise sense related to the decomposition of Lorentz transformations into pure transformations and rotations) with respect to the initial basis, this is the physical meaning of Fermi–Walker's transport.

Finally construct a coordinate system in an open tube $T$, a neighbourhood of $\gamma$, emitting all spacelike geodesics through $\gamma(\tau)$ with initial tangent vector $\sum_{i=1}^3 v^i e_i(\tau)$, for every $\tau$. A point $q\in T$ has coordinates $\tau(q),v^1(q),v^2(q),v^3(q)$ where $\sum_{i=1}^3 v^i e_i(\tau(q))$ is the only vector whose associated geodesic reaches $q$ for the value of its parameter $s=1$ and $\tau(q)$ is the only time along $\gamma$ for that this geodesic reaching $q$ exists.

If $\gamma$ itself is a geodesic, then Fermi–Walker's transport becomes the standard parallel transport and Fermi's coordinates become standard Riemannian coordinates adapted to $\gamma$. In this case, using these coordinates in a neighbourhood $T$ of $\gamma$, we have $\Gamma^a_{bc}=0$, all Christoffel symbols vanish exactly on $\gamma$. This property is not valid for Fermi's coordinates however when $\gamma$ is not a geodesic. Such coordinates are called Fermi coordinates and are named after the Italian physicist Enrico Fermi who first constructed them when he was twenty-one. The above properties are only valid on the geodesic. The Fermi-coordinates adapted to a null geodesic is provided by Mattias Blau, Denis Frank, and Sebastian Weiss.

In the Riemannian case at least, Fermi coordinates can be generalized to an arbitrary submanifold.

== See also ==
- Proper reference frame (flat spacetime)#Proper coordinates or Fermi coordinates
- Geodesic normal coordinates
- Fermi–Walker transport
- Christoffel symbols
- Isothermal coordinates
