= List of mathematical topics in relativity =

This is a list of mathematical topics in relativity, by Wikipedia page.

== Special relativity ==
- Foundational issues
  - principle of relativity
  - speed of light
  - faster-than-light
- biquaternion
- conjugate diameters
- four-vector
  - four-acceleration
  - four-force
  - four-gradient
  - four-momentum
  - four-velocity
- hyperbolic orthogonality
- hyperboloid model
- light-like
- Lorentz covariance
- Lorentz group
- Lorentz transformation
- Lorentz–FitzGerald contraction hypothesis
- Minkowski diagram
- Minkowski space
- Poincaré group
- proper length
- proper time
- rapidity
- relativistic wave equations
- relativistic mass
- split-complex number
- unit hyperbola
- world line

== General relativity ==
- black holes
  - no-hair theorem
  - Hawking radiation
  - Hawking temperature
  - Black hole entropy
  - charged black hole
  - rotating black hole
  - micro black hole
  - Schwarzschild black hole
  - Schwarzschild metric
  - Schwarzschild radius
  - Reissner–Nordström black hole
  - Immirzi parameter
- closed timelike curve
- cosmic censorship hypothesis
- chronology protection conjecture
- Einstein–Cartan theory
- Einstein's field equation
- geodesic
- gravitational redshift
- Penrose–Hawking singularity theorems
- Pseudo-Riemannian manifold
- stress–energy tensor
- worm hole

== Cosmology ==
- anti-de Sitter space
- Ashtekar variables
- Batalin–Vilkovisky formalism
- Big Bang
- Cauchy horizon
- cosmic inflation
- cosmic microwave background
- cosmic variance
- cosmological constant
- dark energy
- dark matter
- de Sitter space
- Friedmann–Lemaître–Robertson–Walker metric
- horizon problem
- large-scale structure of the cosmos
- Randall–Sundrum model
- warped geometry
- Weyl curvature hypothesis
