= Acceleration (special relativity) =

Velocity differential over time, as described in Minkowski spacetime

Accelerations in special relativity (SR) follow, as in Newtonian mechanics, by differentiation of velocity with respect to time. However, because of the Lorentz transformation and time dilation, the concepts of time and distance become more complex, which also leads to more complex definitions of "acceleration".

One can derive transformation formulas for ordinary accelerations in three spatial dimensions (three-acceleration or coordinate acceleration) as measured in an external inertial frame of reference, as well as for the special case of proper acceleration measured by a comoving accelerometer. Another useful formalism is four-acceleration, as its components can be connected in different inertial frames by a Lorentz transformation. Also equations of motion can be formulated which connect acceleration and force.

Equations for several forms of acceleration of bodies and their curved world lines follow from these formulas by integration. Well known special cases are hyperbolic motion for constant longitudinal proper acceleration or uniform circular motion. Eventually, it is also possible to describe these phenomena in accelerated frames in the context of special relativity, see Proper reference frame (flat spacetime). In such frames, effects arise which are analogous to homogeneous gravitational fields, which have some formal similarities to the real, inhomogeneous gravitational fields of curved spacetime in general relativity. In the case of hyperbolic motion one can use Rindler coordinates, in the case of uniform circular motion one can use Born coordinates.

Concerning the historical development, relativistic equations containing accelerations can already be found in the early years of relativity, as summarized in early textbooks by Max von Laue (1911, 1921) or Wolfgang Pauli (1921). For instance, equations of motion and acceleration transformations were developed in the papers of Hendrik Antoon Lorentz (1899, 1904), Henri Poincaré (1905), Albert Einstein (1905), (Note: Einstein, Albert (1905). "Zur Elektrodynamik bewegter Körper". Annalen der Physik. 322 (10): 891–921. Bibcode:1905AnP...322..891E. doi:10.1002/andp.19053221004.; See also: English translation.) Max Planck (1906), and four-acceleration, proper acceleration, hyperbolic motion, accelerating reference frames, Born rigidity, have been analyzed by Einstein (1907), (Note: Einstein, Albert (1908) [1907], "Über das Relativitätsprinzip und die aus demselben gezogenen Folgerungen" (PDF), Jahrbuch der Radioaktivität und Elektronik, 4: 411–462, Bibcode:1908JRE.....4..411E; English translation On the relativity principle and the conclusions drawn from it at Einstein paper project.) Hermann Minkowski (1907, 1908), Max Born (1909), Gustav Herglotz (1909), Arnold Sommerfeld (1910), von Laue (1911), Friedrich Kottler (1912, 1914), see section on history.

SR as the theory of flat Minkowski spacetime remains valid in the presence of accelerations, because general relativity (GR) is only required when there is curvature of spacetime caused by the energy–momentum tensor (which is mainly determined by mass). However, since the amount of spacetime curvature is not particularly high on Earth or its vicinity, SR remains valid for most practical purposes, such as experiments in particle accelerators.

== Three-acceleration ==
In accordance with both Newtonian mechanics and SR, three-acceleration or coordinate acceleration $\mathbf{a}=\left(a_{x},\ a_{y},\ a_{z}\right)$ is the first derivative of velocity $\mathbf{u}=\left(u_{x},\ u_{y},\ u_{z}\right)$ with respect to coordinate time or the second derivative of the location $\mathbf{r}=\left(x,\ y,\ z\right)$ with respect to coordinate time:

$$\mathbf{a}=\frac{d\mathbf{u}}{dt}=\frac{d^{2}\mathbf{r}}{dt^{2}}$$.

However, the theories sharply differ in their predictions in terms of the relation between three-accelerations measured in different inertial frames. In Newtonian mechanics, time is absolute by $t'=t$ in accordance with the Galilean transformation, therefore the three-acceleration derived from it is equal too in all inertial frames:

$$\mathbf{a}=\mathbf{a}'$$.

On the contrary in SR, both $\mathbf{r}$ and $t$ depend on the Lorentz transformation, therefore also three-acceleration $\mathbf{a}$ and its components vary in different inertial frames. When the relative velocity between the frames is directed in the x-direction by $v=v_{x}$ with $\gamma_{v}=1/\sqrt{1-v^{2}/c^{2}}$ as Lorentz factor, the Lorentz transformation has the form

$$\begin{array}{c|c} \begin{align}x' & =\gamma_{v}(x-vt)\\ y' & =y\\ z' & =z\\ t^{\prime} & =\gamma_{v}\left(t-\frac{v}{c^2}x\right) \end{align} & \begin{align}x & =\gamma_{v}(x'+vt')\\ y & =y'\\ z & =z'\\ t & =\gamma_{v}\left(t'+\frac{v}{c^2}x'\right) \end{align} \end{array}$$	1a

or for arbitrary velocities $\mathbf{v}=\left(v_{x},\ v_{y},\ v_{z}\right)$ of magnitude $|\mathbf{v}|=v$:

$$\begin{array}{c|c} \begin{align}\mathbf{r}' & =\mathbf{r}+\mathbf{v}\left[\frac{\left(\mathbf{r\cdot v}\right)}{v^{2}}\left(\gamma_{v}-1\right)-t\gamma_{v}\right]\\ t^{\prime} & =\gamma_{v}\left(t-\frac{\mathbf{r\cdot v}}{c^2}\right) \end{align} & \begin{align}\mathbf{r} & =\mathbf{r}'+\mathbf{v}\left[\frac{\left(\mathbf{r'\cdot v}\right)}{v^{2}}\left(\gamma_{v}-1\right)+t'\gamma_{v}\right]\\ t & =\gamma_{v}\left(t'+\frac{\mathbf{r'\cdot v}}{c^2}\right) \end{align} \end{array}$$	1b

In order to find out the transformation of three-acceleration, one has to differentiate the spatial coordinates $\mathbf{r}$ and $\mathbf{r}'$ of the Lorentz transformation with respect to $t$ and $t'$, from which the transformation of three-velocity (also called velocity-addition formula) between $\mathbf{u}$ and $\mathbf{u}'$ follows, and eventually by another differentiation with respect to $t$ and $t'$ the transformation of three-acceleration between $\mathbf{a}$ and $\mathbf{a}'$ follows. Starting from (1a), this procedure gives the transformation where the accelerations are parallel (x-direction) or perpendicular (y-, z-direction) to the velocity:

$$\begin{array}{c|c} \begin{align}a_{x}^{\prime} & =\frac{a_{x}}{\gamma_{v}^{3}\left(1-\frac{u_{x}v}{c^{2}}\right)^{3}}\\ a_{y}^{\prime} & =\frac{a_{y}}{\gamma_{v}^{2}\left(1-\frac{u_{x}v}{c^{2}}\right)^{2}}+\frac{a_{x}\frac{u_{y}v}{c^{2}}}{\gamma_{v}^{2}\left(1-\frac{u_{x}v}{c^{2}}\right)^{3}}\\ a_{z}^{\prime} & =\frac{a_{z}}{\gamma_{v}^{2}\left(1-\frac{u_{x}v}{c^{2}}\right)^{2}}+\frac{a_{x}\frac{u_{z}v}{c^{2}}}{\gamma_{v}^{2}\left(1-\frac{u_{x}v}{c^{2}}\right)^{3}} \end{align} & \begin{align}a_{x} & =\frac{a_{x}^{\prime}}{\gamma_{v}^{3}\left(1+\frac{u_{x}^{\prime}v}{c^{2}}\right)^{3}}\\ a_{y} & =\frac{a_{y}^{\prime}}{\gamma_{v}^{2}\left(1+\frac{u_{x}^{\prime}v}{c^{2}}\right)^{2}}-\frac{a_{x}^{\prime}\frac{u_{y}^{\prime}v}{c^{2}}}{\gamma_{v}^{2}\left(1+\frac{u_{x}^{\prime}v}{c^{2}}\right)^{3}}\\ a_{z} & =\frac{a_{z}^{\prime}}{\gamma_{v}^{2}\left(1+\frac{u_{x}^{\prime}v}{c^{2}}\right)^{2}}-\frac{a_{x}^{\prime}\frac{u_{z}^{\prime}v}{c^{2}}}{\gamma_{v}^{2}\left(1+\frac{u_{x}^{\prime}v}{c^{2}}\right)^{3}} \end{align} \end{array}$$	1c

or starting from (1b) this procedure gives the result for the general case of arbitrary directions of velocities and accelerations:

$$\begin{align}\mathbf{a}' & =\frac{\mathbf{a}}{\gamma_{v}^{2}\left(1-\frac{\mathbf{v\cdot u}}{c^{2}}\right)^{2}}-\frac{\mathbf{(a\cdot v)v}\left(\gamma_{v}-1\right)}{v^{2}\gamma_{v}^{3}\left(1-\frac{\mathbf{v\cdot u}}{c^{2}}\right)^{3}}+\frac{\mathbf{(a\cdot v)u}}{c^{2}\gamma_{v}^{2}\left(1-\frac{\mathbf{v\cdot u}}{c^{2}}\right)^{3}}\\ \mathbf{a} & =\frac{\mathbf{a}'}{\gamma_{v}^{2}\left(1+\frac{\mathbf{v\cdot u}'}{c^{2}}\right)^{2}}-\frac{\mathbf{(a'\cdot v)v}\left(\gamma_{v}-1\right)}{v^{2}\gamma_{v}^{3}\left(1+\frac{\mathbf{v\cdot u}'}{c^{2}}\right)^{3}}-\frac{\mathbf{(a'\cdot v)u}'}{c^{2}\gamma_{v}^{2}\left(1+\frac{\mathbf{v\cdot u}'}{c^{2}}\right)^{3}} \end{align}$$	1d

This means, if there are two inertial frames $S$ and $S'$ with relative velocity $\mathbf{v}$, then in $S$ the acceleration $\mathbf{a}$ of an object with momentary velocity $\mathbf{u}$ is measured, while in $S'$ the same object has an acceleration $\mathbf{a}'$ and has the momentary velocity $\mathbf{u}'$. As with the velocity addition formulas, also these acceleration transformations guarantee that the resultant speed of the accelerated object can never reach or surpass the speed of light.

== Four-acceleration ==
If four-vectors are used instead of three-vectors, namely $\mathbf{R}$ as four-position and $\mathbf{U}$ as four-velocity, then the four-acceleration $\mathbf{A}=\left(A_{t},\ A_{x},\ A_{y},\ A_{z}\right)=\left(A_{t},\ \mathbf{A}_{r}\right)$ of an object is obtained by differentiation with respect to proper time $\mathbf{\tau}$ instead of coordinate time:

$$\begin{align}\mathbf{A} & =\frac{d\mathbf{U}}{d\tau}=\frac{d^{2}\mathbf{R}}{d\tau^{2}}=\left(c\frac{d^{2}t}{d\tau^{2}},\ \frac{d^{2}\mathbf{r}}{d\tau^{2}}\right)\\ & =\left(\gamma^{4}\frac{\mathbf{u}\cdot\mathbf{a}}{c},\ \gamma^{4}\frac{(\mathbf{a}\cdot\mathbf{u})\mathbf{u}}{c^{2}}+\gamma^{2}\mathbf{a}\right) \end{align}$$	2a

where $\mathbf{a}$ is the object's three-acceleration and $\mathbf{u}$ its momentary three-velocity of magnitude $|\mathbf{u}|=u$ with the corresponding Lorentz factor $\gamma=1/\sqrt{1-u^{2}/c^{2}}$. If only the spatial part is considered, and when the velocity is directed in the x-direction by $u=u_{x}$ and only accelerations parallel (x-direction) or perpendicular (y-, z-direction) to the velocity are considered, the expression is reduced to:

$$\mathbf{A}_{r}=\mathbf{a}\left(\gamma^{4},\ \gamma^{2},\ \gamma^{2}\right)$$

Unlike the three-acceleration previously discussed, it is not necessary to derive a new transformation for four-acceleration, because as with all four-vectors, the components of $\mathbf{A}$ and $\mathbf{A}'$ in two inertial frames with relative speed $v$ are connected by a Lorentz transformation analogous to (1a, 1b). Another property of four-vectors is the invariance of the inner product $\mathbf{A}^{2}=-A_{t}^{2}+\mathbf{A}_{r}^{2}$ or its magnitude $|\mathbf{A}|=\sqrt{\mathbf{A}^{2}}$, which gives in this case:

$|\mathbf{A}'|=|\mathbf{A}|=\sqrt{\gamma^{4}\left[\mathbf{a}^{2}+\gamma^{2}\left(\frac{\mathbf{u}\cdot\mathbf{a}}{c}\right)^{2}\right]}$.	2b

== Proper acceleration ==
In infinitesimal small durations there is always one inertial frame, which momentarily has the same velocity as the accelerated body, and in which the Lorentz transformation holds. The corresponding three-acceleration $\mathbf{a}^{0}=\left(a_{x}^{0},\ a_{y}^{0},\ a_{z}^{0}\right)$ in these frames can be directly measured by an accelerometer, and is called proper acceleration or rest acceleration. The relation of $\mathbf{a}^{0}$ in a momentary inertial frame $S'$ and $\mathbf{a}$ measured in an external inertial frame $S$ follows from (1c, 1d) with $\mathbf{a}'=\mathbf{a}^{0}$, $\mathbf{u}'=0$, $\mathbf{u}=\mathbf{v}$ and $\gamma=\gamma_{v}$. So in terms of (1c), when the velocity is directed in the x-direction by $u=u_{x}=v=v_{x}$ and when only accelerations parallel (x-direction) or perpendicular (y-, z-direction) to the velocity are considered, it follows:

$$\begin{array}{c|c|cc} \begin{align}a_{x}^{0} & =\frac{a_{x}}{\left(1-\frac{u^{2}}{c^{2}}\right)^{3/2}}\\ a_{y}^{0} & =\frac{a_{y}}{1-\frac{u^{2}}{c^{2}}}\\ a_{z}^{0} & =\frac{a_{z}}{1-\frac{u^{2}}{c^{2}}} \end{align} & \begin{align}a_{x} & =a_{x}^{0}\left(1-\frac{u^{2}}{c^{2}}\right)^{3/2}\\ a_{y} & =a_{y}^{0}\left(1-\frac{u^{2}}{c^{2}}\right)\\ a_{z} & =a_{z}^{0}\left(1-\frac{u^{2}}{c^{2}}\right) \end{align} & \text{or} & \begin{align}\mathbf{a}^{0} & =\mathbf{a}\left(\gamma^{3},\ \gamma^{2},\ \gamma^{2}\right)\\ \mathbf{a} & =\mathbf{\mathbf{a}}^{0}\left(\frac{1}{\gamma^{3}},\ \frac{1}{\gamma^{2}},\ \frac{1}{\gamma^{2}}\right) \end{align} \end{array}$$	3a

Generalized by (1d) for arbitrary directions of $\mathbf{u}$ of magnitude $|\mathbf{u}|=u$:

$$\begin{align}\mathbf{a}^{0} & =\gamma^{2}\left[\mathbf{a}+\frac{(\mathbf{a}\cdot\mathbf{u})\mathbf{u}}{u^{2}}\left(\gamma-1\right)\right]\\
\mathbf{a} & =\frac{1}{\gamma^{2}}\left[\mathbf{a}^{0}-\frac{(\mathbf{a}^{0}\cdot\mathbf{u})\mathbf{u}}{u^{2}}\left(1-\frac{1}{\gamma}\right)\right]
\end{align}$$

There is also a close relationship to the magnitude of four-acceleration: As it is invariant, it can be determined in the momentary inertial frame $S'$, in which $\mathbf{A}_{r}^{\prime}=\mathbf{a}^{0}$ and by $dt'/d\tau=1$ it follows $d^{2}t'/d\tau^{2}=A_{t}^{\prime}=0$:

$|\mathbf{A}'|=\sqrt{0+\left.\mathbf{a}^{0}\right.^{2}}=|\mathbf{a}^{0}|$.	3b

Thus the magnitude of four-acceleration corresponds to the magnitude of proper acceleration. By combining this with (2b), an alternative method for the determination of the connection between $\mathbf{a}^{0}$ in $S'$ and $\mathbf{a}$ in $S$ is given, namely

$$|\mathbf{a}^{0}|=|\mathbf{A}|=\sqrt{\gamma^{4}\left[\mathbf{a}^{2}+\gamma^{2}\left(\frac{\mathbf{u}\cdot\mathbf{a}}{c}\right)^{2}\right]}$$

from which (3a) follows again when the velocity is directed in the x-direction by $u=u_{x}$ and only accelerations parallel (x-direction) or perpendicular (y-, z-direction) to the velocity are considered.

== Acceleration and force ==
Assuming constant mass $m$, the four-force $\mathbf{F}$ as a function of three-force $\mathbf{f}$ is related to four-acceleration (2a) by $\mathbf{F}=m\mathbf{A}$, thus:

$\mathbf{F}=\left(\gamma\frac{\mathbf{f}\cdot\mathbf{u}}{c},\ \gamma\mathbf{f}\right)=m\mathbf{A}=m\left(\gamma^{4}\left(\frac{\mathbf{u}\cdot\mathbf{a}}{c}\right),\ \gamma^{4}\left(\frac{\mathbf{u}\cdot\mathbf{a}}{c^{2}}\right)\mathbf{u}+\gamma^{2}\mathbf{a}\right)$	4a

The relation between three-force and three-acceleration for arbitrary directions of the velocity is thus

$$\begin{align}\mathbf{f} & =m\gamma^{3}\left(\frac{(\mathbf{a}\cdot\mathbf{u})\mathbf{u}}{c^{2}}\right)+m\gamma\mathbf{a}\\ \mathbf{a} & =\frac{1}{m\gamma}\left(\mathbf{f}-\frac{(\mathbf{f}\cdot\mathbf{u})\mathbf{u}}{c^{2}}\right) \end{align}$$	4b

When the velocity is directed in the x-direction by $u=u_{x}$ and only accelerations parallel (x-direction) or perpendicular (y-, z-direction) to the velocity are considered

$$\begin{array}{c|c|cc} \begin{align}f_{x} & =\frac{ma_{x}}{\left(1-\frac{u^{2}}{c^{2}}\right)^{3/2}}\\ f_{y} & =\frac{ma_{y}}{\sqrt{1-\frac{u^{2}}{c^{2}}}}\\ f_{z} & =\frac{ma_{z}}{\sqrt{1-\frac{u^{2}}{c^{2}}}} \end{align} & \begin{align}a_{x} & =\frac{f_{x}}{m}\left(1-\frac{u^{2}}{c^{2}}\right)^{3/2}\\ a_{y} & =\frac{f_{y}}{m}\sqrt{1-\frac{u^{2}}{c^{2}}}\\ a_{z} & =\frac{f_{z}}{m}\sqrt{1-\frac{u^{2}}{c^{2}}} \end{align} & \text{or} & \begin{align}\mathbf{f} & =m\mathbf{a}\left(\gamma^{3},\ \gamma,\ \gamma\right)\\ \mathbf{a} & =\frac{\mathbf{f}}{m}\left(\frac{1}{\gamma^{3}},\ \frac{1}{\gamma},\ \frac{1}{\gamma}\right) \end{align} \end{array}$$	4c

Therefore, the Newtonian definition of mass as the ratio of three-force and three-acceleration is disadvantageous in SR, because such a mass would depend both on velocity and direction. Consequently, the following mass definitions used in older textbooks are not used anymore:

$m_{\Vert}=\frac{f_{x}}{a_{x}}=m\gamma^{3}$ as "longitudinal mass",

$m_{\perp}=\frac{f_{y}}{a_{y}}=\frac{f_{z}}{a_{z}}=m\gamma$ as "transverse mass".

The relation (4b) between three-acceleration and three-force can also be obtained from the equation of motion

$\mathbf{f}=\frac{d\mathbf{p}}{dt}=\frac{d(m\gamma\mathbf{u})}{dt}=\frac{d(m\gamma)}{dt}\mathbf{u}+m\gamma\frac{d\mathbf{u}}{dt}=m\gamma^{3}\left(\frac{(\mathbf{a}\cdot\mathbf{u})\mathbf{u}}{c^{2}}\right)+m\gamma\mathbf{a}$	4d

where $\mathbf{p}$ is the three-momentum. The corresponding transformation of three-force between $\mathbf{f}$ in $S$ and $\mathbf{f}'$ in $S'$ (when the relative velocity between the frames is directed in the x-direction by $v=v_{x}$ and only accelerations parallel (x-direction) or perpendicular (y-, z-direction) to the velocity are considered) follows by substitution of the relevant transformation formulas for $\mathbf{u}$, $\mathbf{a}$, $m\gamma$, $d(m\gamma)/dt$, or from the Lorentz transformed components of four-force, with the result:

$$\begin{array}{c|c} \begin{align}f_{x}^{\prime} & =\frac{f_{x}-\frac{v}{c^{2}}(\mathbf{f}\cdot\mathbf{u})}{1-\frac{u_{x}v}{c^{2}}}\\ f_{y}^{\prime} & =\frac{f_{y}}{\gamma_{v}\left(1-\frac{u_{x}v}{c^{2}}\right)}\\ f_{z}^{\prime} & =\frac{f_{z}}{\gamma_{v}\left(1-\frac{u_{x}v}{c^{2}}\right)} \end{align} & \begin{align}f_{x} & =\frac{f_{x}^{\prime}+\frac{v}{c^{2}}(\mathbf{f}^{\prime}\cdot\mathbf{u}^{\prime})}{1+\frac{u_{x}^{\prime}v}{c^{2}}}\\ f_{y} & =\frac{f_{y}^{\prime}}{\gamma_{v}\left(1+\frac{u_{x}^{\prime}v}{c^{2}}\right)}\\ f_{z} & =\frac{f_{z}^{\prime}}{\gamma_{v}\left(1+\frac{u_{x}^{\prime}v}{c^{2}}\right)} \end{align} \end{array}$$	4e

Or generalized for arbitrary directions of $\mathbf{u}$, as well as $\mathbf{v}$ with magnitude $|\mathbf{v}|=v$:

$$\begin{align}\mathbf{f}' & =\frac{\frac{\mathbf{f}}{\gamma_{v}}-\left\{ (\mathbf{f\cdot u})\frac{v^{2}}{c^{2}}-(\mathbf{f\cdot v})\left(1-\frac{1}{\gamma_{v}}\right)\right\} \frac{\mathbf{v}}{v^{2}}}{1-\frac{\mathbf{v\cdot u}}{c^{2}}}\\ \mathbf{f} & =\frac{\frac{\mathbf{f}'}{\gamma_{v}}+\left\{ (\mathbf{f'\cdot u}')\frac{v^{2}}{c^{2}}+(\mathbf{f'\cdot v})\left(1-\frac{1}{\gamma_{v}}\right)\right\} \frac{\mathbf{v}}{v^{2}}}{1+\frac{\mathbf{v\cdot u'}}{c^{2}}} \end{align}$$	4f

== Proper acceleration and proper force ==
The force $\mathbf{f}^{0}$ in a momentary inertial frame measured by a comoving spring balance can be called proper force. It follows from (4e, 4f) by setting $\mathbf{f}'=\mathbf{f}^{0}$ and $\mathbf{u}'=0$ as well as $\mathbf{u}=\mathbf{v}$ and $\gamma=\gamma_{v}$. Thus by (4e) where only accelerations parallel (x-direction) or perpendicular (y-, z-direction) to the velocity $u=u_{x}=v=v_{x}$ are considered:

$$\begin{array}{c|c|cc} \begin{align}f_{x}^{0} & =f_{x}\\ f_{y}^{0} & =\frac{f_{y}}{\sqrt{1-\frac{u^{2}}{c^{2}}}}\\ f_{z}^{0} & =\frac{f_{z}}{\sqrt{1-\frac{u^{2}}{c^{2}}}} \end{align} & \begin{align}f_{x} & =f_{x}^{0}\\ f_{y} & =f_{y}^{0}\sqrt{1-\frac{u^{2}}{c^{2}}}\\ f_{z} & =f_{z}^{0}\sqrt{1-\frac{u^{2}}{c^{2}}} \end{align} & \text{or} & \begin{align}\mathbf{f}^{0} & =\mathbf{f}\left(1,\ \gamma,\ \gamma\right)\\ \mathbf{f} & =\mathbf{f}^{0}\left(1,\ \frac{1}{\gamma},\ \frac{1}{\gamma}\right) \end{align} \end{array}$$	5a

Generalized by (4f) for arbitrary directions of $\mathbf{u}$ of magnitude $|\mathbf{u}|=u$:

$$\begin{align}\mathbf{f}^{0} & =\mathbf{f}\gamma-\frac{(\mathbf{f}\cdot\mathbf{u})\mathbf{u}}{u^{2}}(\gamma-1)\\
\mathbf{f} & =\frac{\mathbf{f}^{0}}{\gamma}+\frac{(\mathbf{f}^{0}\cdot\mathbf{u})\mathbf{u}}{u^{2}}\left(1-\frac{1}{\gamma}\right)
\end{align}$$

Since in momentary inertial frames one has four-force $\mathbf{F}=\left(0,\,\mathbf{f}^{0}\right)$ and four-acceleration $\mathbf{A}=\left(0,\,\mathbf{a}^{0}\right)$, equation (4a) produces the Newtonian relation $\mathbf{f}^{0}=m\mathbf{a}^{0}$, therefore (3a, 4c, 5a) can be summarized

$$\begin{align}\mathbf{f}^{0} & =\mathbf{f}\left(1,\ \gamma,\ \gamma\right)=m\mathbf{a}^{0}=m\mathbf{a}\left(\gamma^{3},\ \gamma^{2},\ \gamma^{2}\right)\\ \mathbf{f} & =\mathbf{f}^{0}\left(1,\ \frac{1}{\gamma},\ \frac{1}{\gamma}\right)=m\mathbf{a}^{0}\left(1,\ \frac{1}{\gamma},\ \frac{1}{\gamma}\right)=m\mathbf{a}\left(\gamma^{3},\ \gamma,\ \gamma\right) \end{align}$$	5b

By that, the apparent contradiction in the historical definitions of transverse mass $m_{\perp}$ can be explained. Einstein (1905) described the relation between three-acceleration and proper force

$$m_{\perp\ \mathrm{Einstein}}=\frac{f_{y}^{0}}{a_{y}}=\frac{f_{z}^{0}}{a_{z}}=m\gamma^{2}$$,

while Lorentz (1899, 1904) and Planck (1906) described the relation between three-acceleration and three-force

$$m_{\perp\ \mathrm{Lorentz}}=\frac{f_{y}}{a_{y}}=\frac{f_{z}}{a_{z}}=m\gamma$$.

== Curved world lines ==
By integration of the equations of motion one obtains the curved world lines of accelerated bodies corresponding to a sequence of momentary inertial frames (here, the expression "curved" is related to the form of the worldlines in Minkowski diagrams, which should not be confused with "curved" spacetime of general relativity). In connection with this, the so-called clock hypothesis of clock postulate has to be considered: The proper time of comoving clocks is independent of acceleration, that is, the time dilation of these clocks as seen in an external inertial frame only depends on its relative velocity with respect to that frame. Two simple cases of curved world lines are now provided by integration of equation (3a) for proper acceleration:

a) Hyperbolic motion: The constant, longitudinal proper acceleration $\alpha=a_{x}^{0}=a_{x}\gamma^{3}$ by (3a) leads to the world line

$$\begin{align} & t(\tau)=\frac{c}{\alpha}\sinh\frac{\alpha\tau}{c},\quad x(\tau)=\frac{c^{2}}{\alpha}\left(\cosh\frac{\alpha\tau}{c}-1\right),\quad y=0,\quad z=0,\\ & \tau(t)=\frac{c}{\alpha}\ln\left(\sqrt{1+\left(\frac{\alpha t}{c}\right)^{2}}+\frac{\alpha t}{c}\right),\quad x(t)=\frac{c^{2}}{\alpha}\left(\sqrt{1+\left(\frac{\alpha t}{c}\right)^{2}}-1\right) \end{align}$$	6a

The worldline corresponds to the hyperbolic equation $c^{4}/\alpha^{2}=\left(x+c^{2}/\alpha\right)^{2}-c^{2}t^{2}$, from which the name hyperbolic motion is derived. These equations are often used for the calculation of various scenarios of the twin paradox or Bell's spaceship paradox, or in relation to space travel using constant acceleration.

b) The constant, transverse proper acceleration $a_{y}^{0}=a_{y}\gamma^{2}$ by (3a) can be seen as a centripetal acceleration, leading to the worldline of a body in uniform rotation

$$\begin{align}x & =r\cos\Omega_{0}t=r\cos\Omega\tau\\ y & =r\sin\Omega_{0}t=r\sin\Omega\tau\\ z & =z\\ t & =\gamma\tau=\frac{\tau}{\sqrt{1-\left(\frac{r\Omega_{0}}{c}\right)^{2}}}=\tau\sqrt{1+\left(\frac{r\Omega}{c}\right)^{2}} \end{align}$$	6b

where $v=r\Omega_{0}$ is the tangential speed, $r$ is the orbital radius, $\Omega_{0}$ is the angular velocity as a function of coordinate time, and $\Omega=\gamma\Omega_{0}$ as the proper angular velocity.

A classification of curved worldlines can be obtained by using the differential geometry of triple curves, which can be expressed by spacetime Frenet-Serret formulas. In particular, it can be shown that hyperbolic motion and uniform circular motion are special cases of motions having constant curvatures and torsions, satisfying the condition of Born rigidity. A body is called Born rigid if the spacetime distance between its infinitesimally separated worldlines or points remains constant during acceleration.

== Accelerated reference frames ==
Instead of inertial frames, these accelerated motions and curved worldlines can also be described using accelerated or curvilinear coordinates. The proper reference frame established that way is closely related to Fermi coordinates. For instance, the coordinates for an hyperbolically accelerated reference frame are sometimes called Rindler coordinates, or those of a uniformly rotating reference frame are called rotating cylindrical coordinates (or sometimes Born coordinates). In terms of the equivalence principle, the effects arising in these accelerated frames are analogous to effects in a homogeneous, fictitious gravitational field. In this way it can be seen, that the employment of accelerating frames in SR produces important mathematical relations, which (when further developed) play a fundamental role in the description of real, inhomogeneous gravitational fields in terms of curved spacetime in general relativity.

== History ==
For further information see von Laue, Pauli, Miller, Zahar, Gourgoulhon, and the historical sources in history of special relativity.

1899:
Hendrik Lorentz derived the correct (up to a certain factor $\epsilon$) relations for accelerations, forces and masses between a resting electrostatic systems of particles $S_{0}$ (in a stationary aether), and a system $S$ emerging from it by adding a translation, with $k$ as the Lorentz factor:

$\frac{1}{\varepsilon^{2}}$, $\frac{1}{k\varepsilon^{2}}$, $\frac{1}{k\varepsilon^{2}}$ for $\mathbf{f}/\mathbf{f}^{0}$ by (5a);
$\frac{1}{k^{3}\varepsilon}$, $\frac{1}{k^{2}\varepsilon}$, $\frac{1}{k^{2}\varepsilon}$ for $\mathbf{a}/\mathbf{a}^{0}$ by (3a);
$\frac{k^{3}}{\varepsilon}$, $\frac{k}{\varepsilon}$, $\frac{k}{\varepsilon}$ for $\mathbf{f}/(m\mathbf{a})$, thus longitudinal and transverse mass by (4c);

Lorentz explained that he has no means of determining the value of $\varepsilon$. If he had set $\varepsilon=1$, his expressions would have assumed the exact relativistic form.
1904:
Lorentz derived the previous relations in a more detailed way, namely with respect to the properties of particles resting in the system $\Sigma'$ and the moving system $\Sigma$, with the new auxiliary variable $l$ equal to $1/\epsilon$ compared to the one in 1899, thus:

$\mathfrak{F}(\Sigma)=\left(l^{2},\ \frac{l^{2}}{k},\ \frac{l^{2}}{k}\right)\mathfrak{F}(\Sigma')$ for $\mathbf{f}$ as a function of $\mathbf{f}^{0}$ by (5a);
$m\mathfrak{j}(\Sigma)=\left(l^{2},\ \frac{l^{2}}{k},\ \frac{l^{2}}{k}\right)m\mathfrak{j}(\Sigma')$ for $m\mathbf{a}$ as a function of $m\mathbf{a}^{0}$ by (5b);
$\mathfrak{j}(\Sigma)=\left(\frac{l}{k^{3}},\ \frac{l}{k^{2}},\ \frac{l}{k^{2}}\right)\mathfrak{j}(\Sigma')$ for $\mathbf{a}$ as a function of $\mathbf{a}^{0}$ by (3a);
$m(\Sigma)=\left(k^{3}l,\ kl,\ kl\right)m(\Sigma')$ for longitudinal and transverse mass as a function of the rest mass by (4c, 5b).

This time, Lorentz could show that $l=1$, by which his formulas assume the exact relativistic form. He also formulated the equation of motion

${\displaystyle \mathfrak{F}=\frac{d\mathfrak{G}}{dt}}$ with ${\displaystyle \mathfrak{G}=\frac{e^{2}}{6\pi c^{2}R}kl\mathfrak{w}}$

which corresponds to (4d) with $\mathbf{f}=\frac{d\mathbf{p}}{dt}=\frac{d(m\gamma\mathbf{u})}{dt}$, with $l=1$, $\mathfrak{F}=\mathbf{f}$, $\mathfrak{G}=\mathbf{p}$, $\mathfrak{w}=\mathbf{u}$, $k=\gamma$, and $e^{2}/(6\pi c^{2}R)=m$ as electromagnetic rest mass. Furthermore, he argued, that these formulas should not only hold for forces and masses of electrically charged particles, but for other processes as well so that the earth's motion through the aether remains undetectable.
1905:
Henri Poincaré introduced the transformation of three-force (4e):

$$X_{1}^{\prime}=\frac{k}{l^{3}}\frac{\rho}{\rho^{\prime}}\left(X_{1}+\epsilon\Sigma X_{1}\xi\right),\quad Y_{1}^{\prime}=\frac{\rho}{\rho^{\prime}}\frac{Y_{1}}{l^{3}},\quad Z_{1}^{\prime}=\frac{\rho}{\rho^{\prime}}\frac{Z_{1}}{l^{3}}$$

with $\frac{\rho}{\rho^{\prime}}=\frac{k}{l^{3}}(1+\epsilon\xi)$, and $k$ as the Lorentz factor, $\rho$ the charge density. Or in modern notation: $\epsilon=v$, $\xi=u_{x}$, $\left(X_{1},\ Y_{1},\ Z_{1}\right)=\mathbf{f}$, and $\Sigma X_{1}\xi=\mathbf{f}\cdot\mathbf{u}$. As Lorentz, he set $l=1$.
1905:
Albert Einstein derived the equations of motions on the basis of his special theory of relativity, which represent the relation between equally valid inertial frames without the action of a mechanical aether. Einstein concluded, that in a momentary inertial frame $k$ the equations of motion retain their Newtonian form:

$$\mu\frac{d^{2}\xi}{d\tau^{2}}=\epsilon X',\quad\mu\frac{d^{2}\eta}{d\tau^{2}}=\epsilon Y',\quad\mu\frac{d^{2}\zeta}{d\tau^{2}}=\epsilon Z'$$.

This corresponds to $\mathbf{f}^{0}=m\mathbf{a}^{0}$, because $\mu=m$ and $\left(\frac{d^{2}\xi}{d\tau^{2}},\ \frac{d^{2}\eta}{d\tau^{2}},\ \frac{d^{2}\zeta}{d\tau^{2}}\right)=\mathbf{a}^{0}$ and $\left(\epsilon X',\ \epsilon Y',\ \epsilon Z'\right)=\mathbf{f}^{0}$. By transformation into a relatively moving system $K$ he obtained the equations for the electrical and magnetic components observed in that frame:

$$\frac{d^{2}x}{dt^{2}}=\frac{\epsilon}{\mu}\frac{1}{\beta^{3}}X,\quad\frac{d^{2}y}{dt^{2}}=\frac{\epsilon}{\mu}\frac{1}{\beta}\left(Y-\frac{v}{V}N\right),\quad\frac{d^{2}z}{dt^{2}}=\frac{\epsilon}{\mu}\frac{1}{\beta}\left(Z+\frac{v}{V}M\right)$$.

This corresponds to (4c) with $\mathbf{a}=\frac{\mathbf{f}}{m}\left(\frac{1}{\gamma^{3}},\ \frac{1}{\gamma},\ \frac{1}{\gamma}\right)$, because $\mu=m$ and $\left(\frac{d^{2}x}{dt^{2}},\ \frac{d^{2}y}{dt^{2}},\ \frac{d^{2}z}{dt^{2}}\right)=\mathbf{a}$ and $\left[\epsilon X,\ \epsilon\left(Y-\frac{v}{V}N\right),\ \epsilon\left(Z+\frac{v}{V}M\right)\right]=\mathbf{f}$ and $\beta=\gamma$. Consequently, Einstein determined the longitudinal and transverse mass, even though he related it to the force $\left(\epsilon X',\ \epsilon Y',\ \epsilon Z'\right)=\mathbf{f}^{0}$ in the momentary rest frame measured by a comoving spring balance, and to the three-acceleration $\mathbf{a}$ in system $K$:

$$\begin{array}{c|c}
\begin{align}\mu\beta^{3}\frac{d^{2}x}{dt^{2}} & =\epsilon X=\epsilon X'\\
\mu\beta^{2}\frac{d^{2}y}{dt^{2}} & =\epsilon\beta\left(Y-\frac{v}{V}N\right)=\epsilon Y'\\
\mu\beta^{2}\frac{d^{2}z}{dt^{2}} & =\epsilon\beta\left(Z+\frac{v}{V}M\right)=\epsilon Z'
\end{align}
& \begin{align}\frac{\mu}{\left(\sqrt{1-\left(\frac{v}{V}\right)^{2}}\right)^{3}} & \ \text{longitudinal mass}\\
\\
\frac{\mu}{1-\left(\frac{v}{V}\right)^{2}} & \ \text{transverse mass}
\end{align}
\end{array}$$

This corresponds to (5b) with $m\mathbf{a}\left(\gamma^{3},\ \gamma^{2},\ \gamma^{2}\right)=\mathbf{f}\left(1,\ \gamma,\ \gamma\right)=\mathbf{f}^{0}$.
1905:
Poincaré introduces the transformation of three-acceleration (1c):

$$\frac{d\xi^{\prime}}{dt^{\prime}}=\frac{d\xi}{dt}\frac{1}{k^{3}\mu^{3}},\quad\frac{d\eta^{\prime}}{dt^{\prime}}=\frac{d\eta}{dt}\frac{1}{k^{2}\mu^{2}}-\frac{d\xi}{dt}\frac{\eta\epsilon}{k^{2}\mu^{3}},\quad\frac{d\zeta^{\prime}}{dt^{\prime}}=\frac{d\zeta}{dt}\frac{1}{k^{2}\mu^{2}}-\frac{d\xi}{dt}\frac{\zeta\epsilon}{k^{2}\mu^{3}}$$

where $\left(\xi,\ \eta,\ \zeta\right)=\mathbf{u}$ as well as $k=\gamma$ and $\epsilon=v$ and $\mu=1+\xi\epsilon=1+u_{x}v$.
Furthermore, he introduced the four-force in the form:

$$k_{0}X_{1},\quad k_{0}Y_{1},\quad k_{0}Z_{1},\quad k_{0}T_{1}$$

where $k_{0}=\gamma_{0}$ and $\left(X_{1},\ Y_{1},\ Z_{1}\right)=\mathbf{f}$ and $T_{1}=\Sigma X_{1}\xi=\mathbf{f}\cdot\mathbf{u}$.
1906:
Max Planck derived the equation of motion

$$\frac{m\ddot{x}}{\sqrt{1-\frac{q^{2}}{c^{2}}}}=e\mathfrak{E}_{x}-\frac{e\dot{x}}{c^{2}}\left(\dot{x}\mathfrak{E}_{x}+\dot{y}\mathfrak{E}_{y}+\dot{z}\mathfrak{E}_{z}\right)+\frac{e}{c}\left(\dot{y}\mathfrak{H}_{z}-\dot{z}\mathfrak{H}_{y}\right)\ \text{etc.}$$

with

$e\left(\dot{x}\mathfrak{E}_{x}+\dot{y}\mathfrak{E}_{y}+\dot{z}\mathfrak{E}_{z}\right)=\frac{m\left(\dot{x}\ddot{x}+\dot{y}\ddot{y}+\dot{z}\ddot{z}\right)}{\left(1-\frac{q^{2}}{c^{2}}\right)^{3/2}}$ and $e\mathfrak{E}_{x}+\frac{e}{c}\left(\dot{y}\mathfrak{H}_{z}-\dot{z}\mathfrak{H}_{y}\right)=X\ \text{etc.}$

and

$$\frac{d}{dt}\left\{ \frac{m\dot{x}}{\sqrt{1-\frac{q^{2}}{c^{2}}}}\right\} =X\ \text{etc.}$$

The equations correspond to (4d) with

$\mathbf{f}=\frac{d\mathbf{p}}{dt}=\frac{d(m\gamma\mathbf{u})}{dt}=m\gamma^{3}\left(\frac{(\mathbf{a}\cdot\mathbf{u})\mathbf{u}}{c^{2}}\right)+m\gamma\mathbf{a}$, with $X=f_{x}$ and $q=v$ and $\dot{x}\ddot{x}+\dot{y}\ddot{y}+\dot{z}\ddot{z}=\mathbf{u}\cdot\mathbf{a}$, in agreement with those given by Lorentz (1904).

1907:
Einstein analyzed a uniformly accelerated reference frame and obtained formulas for coordinate dependent time dilation and speed of light, analogous to those given by Kottler-Møller-Rindler coordinates.

1907:
Hermann Minkowski defined the relation between the four-force (which he called the moving force) and the four acceleration

$$m\frac{d}{d\tau}\frac{dx}{d\tau}=R_{x},\quad m\frac{d}{d\tau}\frac{dy}{d\tau}=R_{y},\quad m\frac{d}{d\tau}\frac{dz}{d\tau}=R_{z},\quad m\frac{d}{d\tau}\frac{dt}{d\tau}=R_{t}$$

corresponding to $m\mathbf{A}=\mathbf{F}$.
1908:
Minkowski denotes the second derivative $x,y,z,t$ with respect to proper time as "acceleration vector" (four-acceleration). He showed, that its magnitude at an arbitrary point $P$ of the worldline is $c^{2}/\varrho$, where $\varrho$ is the magnitude of a vector directed from the center of the corresponding "curvature hyperbola" (German: Krümmungshyperbel) to $P$.

1909:
Max Born denotes the motion with constant magnitude of Minkowski's acceleration vector as "hyperbolic motion" (German: Hyperbelbewegung), in the course of his study of rigidly accelerated motion. He set $p=dx/d\tau$ (now called proper velocity) and $q=-dt/d\tau=\sqrt{1+p^{2}/c^{2}}$ as Lorentz factor and $\tau$ as proper time, with the transformation equations

$$x=-q\xi,\quad y=\eta,\quad z=\zeta,\quad t=\frac{p}{c^{2}}\xi$$.

which corresponds to (6a) with $\xi=c^{2}/\alpha$ and $p=c\sinh(\alpha\tau/c)$. Eliminating $p$ Born derived the hyperbolic equation $x^{2}-c^{2}t^{2}=\xi^{2}$, and defined the magnitude of acceleration as $b=c^{2}/\xi$. He also noticed that his transformation can be used to transform into a "hyperbolically accelerated reference system" (German: hyperbolisch beschleunigtes Bezugsystem).
1909:
Gustav Herglotz extends Born's investigation to all possible cases of rigidly accelerated motion, including uniform rotation.

1910:
Arnold Sommerfeld brought Born's formulas for hyperbolic motion in a more concise form with $l=ict$ as the imaginary time variable and $\varphi$ as an imaginary angle:

$$x=r\cos\varphi,\quad y=y',\quad z=z',\quad l=r\sin\varphi$$

He noted that when $r,y,z$ are variable and $\varphi$ is constant, they describe the worldline of a charged body in hyperbolic motion. But if $r,y,z$ are constant and $\varphi$ is variable, they denote the transformation into its rest frame.
1911:
Sommerfeld explicitly used the expression "proper acceleration" (German: Eigenbeschleunigung) for the quantity $\dot{v}_{0}$ in $\dot{v}=\dot{v}_{0}\left(1-\beta^{2}\right)^{3/2}$, which corresponds to (3a), as the acceleration in the momentary inertial frame.

1911:
Herglotz explicitly used the expression "rest acceleration" (German: Ruhbeschleunigung) instead of proper acceleration. He wrote it in the form $\gamma_{l}^{0}=\beta^{3}\gamma_{l}$ and $\gamma_{t}^{0}=\beta^{2}\gamma_{t}$ which corresponds to (3a), where $\beta$ is the Lorentz factor and $\gamma_{l}^{0}$ or $\gamma_{t}^{0}$ are the longitudinal and transverse components of rest acceleration.

1911:
Max von Laue derived in the first edition of his monograph "Das Relativitätsprinzip" the transformation for three-acceleration by differentiation of the velocity addition

$$\begin{align}\mathfrak{\dot{q}}_{x} & =\left(\frac{c\sqrt{c^{2}-v^{2}}}{c^{2}+v\mathfrak{q}_{x}^{\prime}}\right)^{3}\mathfrak{\dot{q}}_{x}^{\prime}, & \mathfrak{\dot{q}}_{y} & =\left(\frac{c\sqrt{c^{2}-v^{2}}}{c^{2}+v\mathfrak{q}_{x}^{\prime}}\right)^{2}\left(\mathfrak{\dot{q}}_{x}^{\prime}-\frac{v\mathfrak{q}_{y}^{\prime}\mathfrak{\dot{q}}_{x}^{\prime}}{c^{2}+v\mathfrak{q}_{x}^{\prime}}\right),\end{align}$$

equivalent to (1c) as well as to Poincaré (1905/6). From that he derived the transformation of rest acceleration (equivalent to 3a), and eventually the formulas for hyperbolic motion which corresponds to (6a):

$$\pm\mathfrak{q}_{x}=\pm\frac{dx}{dt}=\frac{cbt}{\sqrt{c^{2}+b^{2}t^{2}}},\quad\pm\left(x-x_{0}\right)=\frac{c}{b}\sqrt{c^{2}+b^{2}t^{2}},$$

thus

$$x^{2}-c^{2}t^{2}=x^{2}-u^{2}=c^{4}/b^{2},\quad y=\eta,\quad z=\zeta$$,

and the transformation into a hyperbolic reference system with imaginary angle $\varphi$:

$$\begin{array}{c|c}
\begin{align}X & =R\cos\varphi\\
L & =R\sin\varphi
\end{align}
& \begin{align}R^{2} & =X^{2}+L^{2}\\
\tan\varphi & =\frac{L}{X}
\end{align}
\end{array}$$.

He also wrote the transformation of three-force as

$$\begin{align}\mathfrak{K}_{x} & =\frac{\mathfrak{K}_{x}^{\prime}+\frac{v}{c^{2}}(\mathfrak{q'K'})}{1+\frac{v\mathfrak{q}_{x}^{\prime}}{c^{2}}}, & \mathfrak{K}_{y} & =\mathfrak{K}_{y}^{\prime}\frac{\sqrt{1-\beta^{2}}}{1+\frac{v\mathfrak{q}_{x}^{\prime}}{c^{2}}}, & \mathfrak{K}_{z} & =\mathfrak{K}_{z}^{\prime}\frac{\sqrt{1-\beta^{2}}}{1+\frac{v\mathfrak{q}_{x}^{\prime}}{c^{2}}},\end{align}$$

equivalent to (4e) as well as to Poincaré (1905).
1912–1914:
Friedrich Kottler obtained general covariance of Maxwell's equations, and used four-dimensional Frenet-Serret formulas to analyze the Born rigid motions given by Herglotz (1909). He also obtained the proper reference frames for hyperbolic motion and uniform circular motion.

1913:
von Laue replaced in the second edition of his book the transformation of three-acceleration by Minkowski's acceleration vector for which he coined the name "four-acceleration" (German: Viererbeschleunigung), defined by $\dot{Y}=\frac{dY}{d\tau}$ with $Y$ as four-velocity. He showed, that the magnitude of four-acceleration corresponds to the rest acceleration $\dot{\mathfrak{q}}^{0}$ by

$$|\dot{Y|}=\frac{1}{c}|\dot{\mathfrak{q}}^{0}|$$,

which corresponds to (3b). Subsequently, he derived the same formulas as in 1911 for the transformation of rest acceleration and hyperbolic motion, and the hyperbolic reference frame.

== Bibliography ==
- Ashtekar, A.; Petkov, V. (2014). Springer Handbook of Spacetime. Springer. ISBN 978-3642419928.
- Bini, D.; Lusanna, L.; Mashhoon, B. (2005). "Limitations of radar coordinates". International Journal of Modern Physics D. 14 (8): 1413–1429. arXiv:gr-qc/0409052. Bibcode:2005IJMPD..14.1413B. doi:10.1142/S0218271805006961. S2CID 17909223.
- Ferraro, R. (2007). Einstein's Space-Time: An Introduction to Special and General Relativity. Spektrum. ISBN 978-0387699462.
- Fraundorf, P. (2012). "A traveler-centered intro to kinematics". IV-B. arXiv:1206.2877 [physics.pop-ph].
- French, A.P. (1968). Special Relativity. CRC Press. ISBN 1420074814.
- Freund, J. (2008). Special Relativity for Beginners: A Textbook for Undergraduates. World Scientific. ISBN 978-9812771599.
- Gourgoulhon, E. (2013). Special Relativity in General Frames: From Particles to Astrophysics. Springer. ISBN 978-3642372766.
- von Laue, M. (1921). Die Relativitätstheorie, Band 1 (fourth edition of "Das Relativitätsprinzip" ed.). Vieweg.; First edition 1911, second expanded edition 1913, third expanded edition 1919.
- Koks, D. (2006). Explorations in Mathematical Physics. Springer. ISBN 0387309438.
- Kopeikin, S.; Efroimsky, M.; Kaplan, G. (2011). Relativistic Celestial Mechanics of the Solar System. John Wiley & Sons. ISBN 978-3527408566.
- Miller, Arthur I. (1981). Albert Einstein's special theory of relativity. Emergence (1905) and early interpretation (1905–1911). Reading: Addison–Wesley. ISBN 0-201-04679-2.
- Misner, C. W.; Thorne, K. S.; Wheeler, J. A. (1973). Gravitation. Freeman. ISBN 0716703440.
- Møller, C. (1955) [1952]. The theory of relativity. Oxford Clarendon Press.
- Nikolić, H. (2000). "Relativistic contraction and related effects in noninertial frames". Physical Review A. 61 (3) 032109. arXiv:gr-qc/9904078. Bibcode:2000PhRvA..61c2109N. doi:10.1103/PhysRevA.61.032109. S2CID 5783649.
- Pauli, Wolfgang (1921), "Die Relativitätstheorie", Encyclopädie der Mathematischen Wissenschaften, 5 (2): 539–776

In English: Pauli, W. (1981) [1921]. Theory of Relativity. Vol. 165. Dover Publications. ISBN 0-486-64152-X.

- Pauri, M.; Vallisneri, M. (2000). "Märzke-Wheeler coordinates for accelerated observers in special relativity". Foundations of Physics Letters. 13 (5): 401–425. arXiv:gr-qc/0006095. Bibcode:2000gr.qc.....6095P. doi:10.1023/A:1007861914639. S2CID 15097773.
- Pfeffer, J.; Nir, S. (2012). Modern Physics: An Introductory Text. World Scientific. ISBN 978-1908979575.
- Shadowitz, A. (1988). Special relativity (Reprint of 1968 ed.). Courier Dover Publications. ISBN 0-486-65743-4.
- Rahaman, F. (2014). The Special Theory of Relativity: A Mathematical Approach. Springer. ISBN 978-8132220800.
- Rebhan, E. (1999). Theoretische Physik I. Heidelberg · Berlin: Spektrum. ISBN 3-8274-0246-8.
- Rindler, W. (1977). Essential Relativity. Springer. ISBN 354007970X.
- Synge, J. L. (1966). "Timelike helices in flat space-time". Proceedings of the Royal Irish Academy, Section A. 65: 27–42. JSTOR 20488646.
- Tolman, R.C. (1917). The theory of the Relativity of Motion. University of California Press. OCLC 13129939.
- Zahar, E. (1989). Einstein's Revolution: A Study in Heuristic. Open Court Publishing Company. ISBN 0-8126-9067-2.
