= Relativistic Euler equations =

Generalization of Euler equations

In fluid mechanics and astrophysics, the relativistic Euler equations are a generalization of the Euler equations that account for the effects of general relativity. They have applications in high-energy astrophysics and numerical relativity, where they are commonly used for describing phenomena such as gamma-ray bursts, accretion phenomena, and neutron stars, often with the addition of a magnetic field. Note: for consistency with the literature, this article makes use of natural units, namely the speed of light $c=1$ and the Einstein summation convention.

== Motivation ==
For most fluids observable on Earth, traditional fluid mechanics based on Newtonian mechanics is sufficient. However, as the fluid velocity approaches the speed of light or moves through strong gravitational fields, or the pressure approaches the energy density ($P\sim\rho$), these equations are no longer valid. Such situations occur frequently in astrophysical applications. For example, gamma-ray bursts often feature speeds only $0.01%$ less than the speed of light, and neutron stars feature gravitational fields that are more than $10^{11}$ times stronger than the Earth's. Under these extreme circumstances, only a relativistic treatment of fluids will suffice.

== Introduction ==
The equations of motion are contained in the continuity equation of the stress–energy tensor $T^{\mu\nu}$:

$$\nabla_\mu T^{\mu\nu} = 0,$$

where $\nabla_\mu$ is the covariant derivative. For a perfect fluid,

$$T^{\mu\nu}  \, =  (e+p)u^\mu u^\nu+p g^{\mu\nu}.$$

Here $e$ is the total mass-energy density (including both rest mass and internal energy density) of the fluid, $p$ is the fluid pressure, $u^\mu$ is the four-velocity of the fluid, and $g^{\mu\nu}$ is the metric tensor. To the above equations, a statement of conservation is usually added, usually conservation of baryon number. If $n$ is the number density of baryons this may be stated

$$\nabla_\mu (nu^\mu) = 0.$$

These equations reduce to the classical Euler equations if the fluid three-velocity is much less than the speed of light, the pressure is much less than the energy density, and the latter is dominated by the rest mass density. To close this system, an equation of state, such as an ideal gas or a Fermi gas, is also added.

== Equations of motion in flat space ==
In the case of flat space, that is $\nabla_{\mu} = \partial_{\mu}$ and using a metric signature of $(-,+,+,+)$, the equations of motion are,
$$\left(e + p\right) u^{\mu} \partial_{\mu} u^{\nu} = -\partial^{\nu}p - u^{\nu} u^{\mu} \partial_{\mu}p$$

Where $e = \rho (c^2 + \varepsilon)$ is the energy density of the system, with $p$ being the pressure, and $u^{\mu} = \gamma(1, \mathbf{v}/{c})$ being the four-velocity of the system.

Expanding out the sums and equations, we have, (using $\frac{d}{dt}$ as the material derivative)
$$\left(e + p\right) \frac{\gamma}{c} \frac{du^{\mu}}{dt} = -\partial^{\mu} p - \frac{\gamma}{c} \frac{dp}{dt} u^{\mu}$$

Then, picking $u^{\nu} = u^i = \frac{\gamma}{c}v_i$ to observe the behavior of the velocity itself, we see that the equations of motion become
$$\left(e + p\right) \frac{\gamma}{c^2} \frac{d}{dt} {\left(\gamma v_i\right)} = -\partial_i p -\frac{\gamma^2}{c^2} \frac{dp}{dt} v_i$$

Note that taking the non-relativistic limit, we have $\frac{1}{c^2} \left(e + p\right) = \rho + \frac{1}{c^2} \rho \varepsilon + \frac{1}{c^2} p \approx \rho$. This says that the energy of the fluid is dominated by its rest energy.

In this limit, we have $\gamma \to 1$ and $c \to \infty$, and can see that we return the Euler Equation of $\rho \frac{dv_i}{dt} = -\partial_i p$.

=== Derivation ===
In order to determine the equations of motion, we take advantage of the following spatial projection tensor condition:
$$\partial_{\mu}T^{\mu\nu} + u_{\alpha}u^{\nu}\partial_{\mu}T^{\mu\alpha} = 0$$

We prove this by looking at $\partial_{\mu}T^{\mu\nu} + u_{\alpha}u^{\nu}\partial_{\mu}T^{\mu\alpha}$ and then multiplying each side by $u_{\nu}$. Upon doing this, and noting that $u^{\mu}u_{\mu} = -1$, we have $u_{\nu}\partial_{\mu}T^{\mu\nu} - u_{\alpha}\partial_{\mu}T^{\mu\alpha}$. Relabeling the indices $\alpha$ as $\nu$ shows that the two completely cancel. This cancellation is the expected result of contracting a temporal tensor with a spatial tensor.

Now, when we note that
$$T^{\mu\nu} = wu^{\mu}u^{\nu} + pg^{\mu\nu}$$

where we have implicitly defined that $w \equiv e+p$, we can calculate that
$$\begin{align}
\partial_{\mu} T^{\mu\nu}    & = \left(\partial_{\mu} w\right) u^{\mu} u^{\nu}    + w \left(\partial_{\mu} u^{\mu}\right) u^{\nu}    + wu^{\mu} \partial_{\mu} u^{\nu}    + \partial^{\nu}   p \\[1ex]
\partial_{\mu} T^{\mu\alpha} & = \left(\partial_{\mu} w\right) u^{\mu} u^{\alpha} + w \left(\partial_{\mu} u^{\mu}\right) u^{\alpha} + wu^{\mu} \partial_{\mu} u^{\alpha} + \partial^{\alpha}p
\end{align}$$

and thus
$$u^{\nu}u_{\alpha}\partial_{\mu}T^{\mu\alpha} = (\partial_{\mu}w)u^{\mu}u^{\nu}u^{\alpha}u_{\alpha} + w(\partial_{\mu}u^{\mu})u^{\nu} u^{\alpha}u_{\alpha} + wu^{\mu}u^{\nu} u_{\alpha}\partial_{\mu}u^{\alpha} + u^{\nu}u_{\alpha}\partial^{\alpha}p$$

Then, let's note the fact that $u^{\alpha}u_{\alpha} = -1$ and $u^{\alpha}\partial_{\nu}u_{\alpha} = 0$. Note that the second identity follows from the first. Under these simplifications, we find that
$$u^{\nu}u_{\alpha}\partial_{\mu}T^{\mu\alpha} = -(\partial_{\mu}w)u^{\mu}u^{\nu} - w(\partial_{\mu}u^{\mu})u^{\nu} + u^{\nu}u^{\alpha}\partial_{\alpha}p$$

and thus by $\partial_{\mu}T^{\mu\nu} + u_{\alpha}u^{\nu}\partial_{\mu}T^{\mu\alpha} = 0$, we have
$$(\partial_{\mu}w)u^{\mu}u^{\nu} + w(\partial_{\mu}u^{\mu}) u^{\nu} + wu^{\mu}\partial_{\mu}u^{\nu} + \partial^{\nu}p -(\partial_{\mu}w)u^{\mu}u^{\nu} - w(\partial_{\mu}u^{\mu})u^{\nu} + u^{\nu}u^{\alpha}\partial_{\alpha}p = 0$$

We have two cancellations, and are thus left with
$$(e+p)u^{\mu}\partial_{\mu}u^{\nu} = - \partial^{\nu}p - u^{\nu}u^{\alpha}\partial_{\alpha}p$$

== See also ==
- Relativistic heat conduction
- Equation of state (cosmology)
