= Four-gradient =

Four-vector analogue of the gradient operation

In differential geometry, the four-gradient (or 4-gradient) $\boldsymbol{\partial}$ is the four-vector analogue of the gradient $\vec{\boldsymbol{\nabla}}$ from vector calculus.

In special relativity and in quantum mechanics, the four-gradient is used to define the properties and relations between the various physical four-vectors and tensors.

== Notation ==
This article uses the (+ − − −) metric signature.

SR and GR are abbreviations for special relativity and general relativity respectively.

$c$ indicates the speed of light in vacuum.

$\eta_{\mu\nu} = \operatorname{diag}[1,-1,-1,-1]$ is the flat spacetime metric of SR.

There are alternate ways of writing four-vector expressions in physics:

- The four-vector style can be used: $\mathbf{A} \cdot \mathbf{B}$, which is typically more compact and can use vector notation, (such as the inner product "dot"), always using bold uppercase to represent the four-vector, and bold lowercase to represent 3-space vectors, e.g. $\vec{\mathbf{a}} \cdot \vec{\mathbf{b}}$. Most of the 3-space vector rules have analogues in four-vector mathematics.
- The Ricci calculus style can be used: $A^\mu \eta_{\mu\nu} B^\nu$, which uses tensor index notation and is useful for more complicated expressions, especially those involving tensors with more than one index, such as $F^{\mu\nu} = \partial^\mu A^\nu - \partial^\nu A^\mu$.

The Latin tensor index ranges in {1, 2, 3}, and represents a 3-space vector, e.g. $A^i = \left(a^1, a^2, a^3\right) = \vec{\mathbf{a}}$.

The Greek tensor index ranges in {0, 1, 2, 3}, and represents a 4-vector, e.g. $A^\mu = \left(a^0, a^1, a^2, a^3\right) = \mathbf{A}$.

In SR physics, one typically uses a concise blend, e.g. $\mathbf{A} = \left(a^0, \vec{\mathbf{a}}\right)$, where $a^0$ represents the temporal component and $\vec{\mathbf{a}}$ represents the spatial 3-component.

Tensors in SR are typically 4D $(m,n)$-tensors, with $m$ upper indices and $n$ lower indices, with the 4D indicating 4 dimensions = the number of values each index can take.

The tensor contraction used in the Minkowski metric can go to either side (see Einstein notation):
$$\mathbf{A} \cdot \mathbf{B} = A^\mu \eta_{\mu\nu} B^\nu = A_\nu B^\nu = A^\mu B_\mu = \sum_{\mu=0}^{3} a^\mu b_\mu = a^0 b^0 - \sum_{i=1}^{3} a^i b^i = a^0 b^0 - \vec{\mathbf{a}} \cdot \vec{\mathbf{b}}$$

== Definition ==
The 4-gradient covariant components compactly written in four-vector and Ricci calculus notation are:
$$\dfrac{\partial}{\partial X^\mu} = \left(\partial_0,\partial_1,\partial_2,\partial_3\right) = \left(\partial_0,\partial_i\right) = \left(\frac{1}{c}\frac{\partial}{\partial t}, \vec{\nabla}\right) = \left(\frac{\partial_t}{c}, \vec{\nabla}\right) = \left(\frac{\partial_t}{c}, \partial_x,\partial_y,\partial_z\right) = \partial_\mu = {}_{,\mu}$$

The comma in the last part above ${}_{,\mu}$ implies the partial differentiation with respect to 4-position $X^\mu$.

The contravariant components are:
$$\boldsymbol{\partial} = \partial^\alpha = \eta^{\alpha \beta} \partial_\beta = \left(\partial^0,\partial^1,\partial^2,\partial^3\right) = \left(\partial^0,\partial^i\right) = \left(\frac{1}{c} \frac{\partial}{\partial t}, -\vec{\nabla} \right) = \left(\frac{\partial_t}{c}, -\vec{\nabla}\right) = \left(\frac{\partial_t}{c}, -\partial_x,-\partial_y,-\partial_z\right)$$

Alternative symbols to $\partial_\alpha$ are $\Box$ and D (although $\Box$ can also signify $\partial^\mu \partial_\mu$ as the d'Alembert operator).

In GR, one must use the more general metric tensor $g^{\alpha \beta}$ and the tensor covariant derivative $\nabla_{\mu} = {}_{;\mu}$ (not to be confused with the vector 3-gradient $\vec{\nabla}$).

The covariant derivative $\nabla_{\nu}$ incorporates the 4-gradient $\partial_\nu$ plus spacetime curvature effects via the Christoffel symbols $\Gamma^{\mu}{}_{\sigma \nu}$

The strong equivalence principle can be stated as:

"Any physical law which can be expressed in tensor notation in SR has exactly the same form in a locally inertial frame of a curved spacetime." The 4-gradient commas (,) in SR are simply changed to covariant derivative semi-colons (;) in GR, with the connection between the two using Christoffel symbols. This is known in relativity physics as the "comma to semi-colon rule".

So, for example, if $T^{\mu\nu}{}_{,\mu} = 0$ in SR, then $T^{\mu\nu}{}_{;\mu} = 0$ in GR.

On a (1,0)-tensor or 4-vector this would be:
$$\begin{align}
\nabla_\beta V^\alpha &= \partial_\beta V^\alpha + V^\mu \Gamma^{\alpha}{}_{\mu\beta} \\[0.1ex]
V^{\alpha}{}_{ ;\beta} &= V^{\alpha}{}_{ ,\beta} + V^\mu \Gamma^{\alpha}{}_{\mu\beta}
\end{align}$$

On a (2,0)-tensor this would be:
$$\begin{align}
\nabla_{\nu} T^{\mu \nu} &= \partial_\nu T^{\mu \nu} + \Gamma^{\mu}{}_{\sigma \nu}T^{\sigma \nu} + \Gamma^{\nu}{}_{\sigma \nu} T^{\mu \sigma} \\
T^{\mu \nu}{}_{;\nu} &= T^{\mu \nu}{}_{,\nu} + \Gamma^{\mu}{}_{\sigma \nu}T^{\sigma \nu} + \Gamma^{\nu}{}_{\sigma \nu} T^{\mu \sigma}
\end{align}$$

== Usage ==
The 4-gradient is used in a number of different ways in special relativity (SR):

Throughout this article the formulas are all correct for the flat spacetime Minkowski coordinates of SR, but have to be modified for the more general curved space coordinates of general relativity (GR).

=== As a 4-divergence and source of conservation laws ===
Divergence is a vector operator that produces a signed scalar field giving the quantity of a vector field's source at each point. Note that in this metric signature [+,−,−,−] the 4-Gradient has a negative spatial component. It gets canceled when taking the 4D dot product since the Minkowski Metric is Diagonal[+1,−1,−1,−1].

The 4-divergence of the 4-position $X^\mu = \left(ct, \vec{\mathbf{x}}\right)$ gives the dimension of spacetime:
$$\boldsymbol{\partial} \cdot \mathbf{X} = \partial^\mu \eta_{\mu\nu} X^\nu = \partial_\nu X^\nu = \left(\frac{\partial_t}{c}, -\vec{\nabla}\right) \cdot (ct,\vec{x}) = \frac{\partial_t}{c}(ct) + \vec{\nabla}\cdot \vec{x} = (\partial_t t) + (\partial_x x + \partial_y y + \partial_z z) = (1) + (3) = 4$$

The 4-divergence of the 4-current density
$$J^\mu = \left(\rho c, \vec{\mathbf{j}}\right) = \rho_o U^\mu = \rho_o \gamma\left(c, \vec{\mathbf{u}}\right) = \left(\rho c, \rho \vec{\mathbf{u}}\right)$$
gives a conservation law – the conservation of charge:
$$\boldsymbol{\partial} \cdot \mathbf{J} = \partial^\mu \eta_{\mu\nu} J^\nu = \partial_\nu J^\nu = \left(\frac{\partial_t}{c}, -\vec{\nabla}\right) \cdot (\rho c,\vec{j}) = \frac{\partial_t}{c} (\rho c) + \vec{\nabla} \cdot \vec{j} = \partial_t \rho + \vec{\nabla} \cdot \vec{j} = 0$$

This means that the time rate of change of the charge density must equal the negative spatial divergence of the current density $\partial_t \rho = -\vec{\nabla}\cdot \vec{j}$.

In other words, the charge inside a box cannot just change arbitrarily, it must enter and leave the box via a current. This is a continuity equation.

The 4-divergence of the 4-number flux (4-dust) $N^\mu = \left(nc, \vec{\mathbf{n}}\right) = n_o U^\mu = n_o \gamma\left(c, \vec{\mathbf{u}}\right) = \left(nc, n\vec{\mathbf{u}}\right)$ is used in particle conservation:
$$\boldsymbol{\partial} \cdot \mathbf{N} = \partial^\mu \eta_{\mu\nu} N^\nu = \partial_\nu N^\nu = \left(\frac{\partial_t}{c}, -\vec{\nabla}\right) \cdot \left(nc, n\vec{\mathbf{u}}\right) = \frac{\partial_t}{c} \left(nc\right) + \vec{\nabla} \cdot n \vec{\mathbf{u}} = \partial_t n + \vec{\nabla}\cdot n\vec{\mathbf{u}} = 0$$

This is a conservation law for the particle number density, typically something like baryon number density.

The 4-divergence of the electromagnetic 4-potential $A^\mu = \left(\frac{\phi}{c}, \vec{\mathbf{a}}\right)$ is used in the Lorenz gauge condition:
$$\boldsymbol{\partial} \cdot \mathbf{A} = \partial^\mu \eta_{\mu\nu} A^\nu = \partial_\nu A^\nu = \left(\frac{\partial_t}{c}, -\vec{\nabla}\right) \cdot \left(\frac{\phi}{c}, \vec{a}\right) = \frac{\partial_t}{c} \left(\frac{\phi}{c}\right) + \vec{\nabla} \cdot \vec{a} = \frac{\partial_t \phi}{c^2} + \vec{\nabla} \cdot \vec{a} = 0$$

This is the equivalent of a conservation law for the EM 4-potential.

The 4-divergence of the transverse traceless 4D (2,0)-tensor $h^{\mu\nu}_{TT}$ representing gravitational radiation in the weak-field limit (i.e. freely propagating far from the source).

The transverse condition
$$\boldsymbol{\partial} \cdot h^{\mu\nu}_{TT} = \partial_\mu h^{\mu\nu}_{TT} = 0$$
is the equivalent of a conservation equation for freely propagating gravitational waves.

The 4-divergence of the stress–energy tensor $T^{\mu \nu}$ as the conserved Noether current associated with spacetime translations, gives four conservation laws in SR:

The conservation of energy (temporal direction) and the conservation of linear momentum (3 separate spatial directions).
$$\boldsymbol{\partial} \cdot T^{\mu \nu} = \partial_{\nu} T^{\mu \nu} = T^{\mu \nu}{}_{,\nu} = 0^\mu = (0,0,0,0)$$

It is often written as:
$$\partial_{\nu} T^{\mu \nu} = T^{\mu \nu}{}_{,\nu} = 0$$
where it is understood that the single zero is actually a 4-vector zero $0^\mu = (0,0,0,0)$.

When the conservation of the stress–energy tensor ($\partial_{\nu} T^{\mu \nu} = 0^\mu$) for a perfect fluid is combined with the conservation of particle number density ($\boldsymbol{\partial} \cdot \mathbf{N} = 0$), both utilizing the 4-gradient, one can derive the relativistic Euler equations, which in fluid mechanics and astrophysics are a generalization of the Euler equations that account for the effects of special relativity. These equations reduce to the classical Euler equations if the fluid 3-space velocity is much less than the speed of light, the pressure is much less than the energy density, and the latter is dominated by the rest mass density.

In flat spacetime and using Cartesian coordinates, if one combines this with the symmetry of the stress–energy tensor, one can show that angular momentum (relativistic angular momentum) is also conserved:
$$\partial_\nu \left(x^{\alpha} T^{\mu \nu} - x^{\mu} T^{\alpha \nu}\right) = \left(x^{\alpha} T^{\mu \nu} - x^{\mu} T^{\alpha \nu}\right)_{,\nu} = 0^{\alpha \mu}$$
where this zero is actually a (2,0)-tensor zero.

=== As a Jacobian matrix for the SR Minkowski metric tensor ===
The Jacobian matrix is the matrix of all first-order partial derivatives of a vector-valued function.

The 4-gradient $\partial^\mu$ acting on the 4-position $X^\nu$ gives the SR Minkowski space metric $\eta^{\mu\nu}$:
$$\begin{align}
\boldsymbol{\partial} [\mathbf{X}] = \partial^\mu[X^\nu] = X^{\nu_,\mu}
&= \left(\frac{\partial_t}{c}, -\vec{\nabla}\right)\left[\left(ct, \vec{x}\right)\right] =
\left(\frac{\partial_t}{c}, -\partial_x, -\partial_y, -\partial_z\right)[(ct, x, y, z)], \\[3pt]
&= \begin{bmatrix}
\frac{\partial_t}{c} ct & \frac{\partial_t}{c} x & \frac{\partial_t}{c} y & \frac{\partial_t}{c} z \\
-\partial_x ct & -\partial_x x & -\partial_x y & -\partial_x z \\
-\partial_y ct & -\partial_y x & -\partial_y y & -\partial_y z \\
-\partial_z ct & -\partial_z x & -\partial_z y & -\partial_z z
\end{bmatrix} =
\begin{bmatrix}
1 &  0 &  0 &  0 \\
0 & -1 &  0 &  0 \\
0 &  0 & -1 &  0 \\
0 &  0 &  0 & -1
\end{bmatrix} \\[3pt]
&= \operatorname{diag}[1,-1,-1,-1] = \eta^{\mu\nu}.
\end{align}$$

For the Minkowski metric, the components $\left[\eta^{\mu\mu}\right] = 1/\left[\eta_{\mu\mu}\right]$ ($\mu$ not summed), with non-diagonal components all zero.

For the Cartesian Minkowski Metric, this gives $\eta^{\mu\nu} = \eta_{\mu\nu} = \operatorname{diag}[1, -1, -1, -1]$.

Generally, $\eta_\mu^\nu = \delta_\mu^\nu = \operatorname{diag}[1,1,1,1]$, where $\delta_\mu^\nu$ is the 4D Kronecker delta.

=== As a way to define the Lorentz transformations ===
The Lorentz transformation is written in tensor form as
$$X^{\mu'} = \Lambda^{~\mu'}_{\nu} X^\nu$$
and since $\Lambda^{\mu'}_\nu$ are just constants, then
$$\dfrac{\partial X^{\mu'} }{ \partial X^\nu} = \Lambda^{\mu'}_\nu$$

Thus, by definition of the 4-gradient
$$\partial_\nu \left[X^{\mu'}\right] = \left(\dfrac{\partial}{\partial X^\nu}\right)\left[X^{\mu'}\right] = \dfrac{\partial X^{\mu'}}{\partial X^\nu} = \Lambda^{\mu'}_\nu$$

This identity is fundamental. Components of the 4-gradient transform according to the inverse of the components of 4-vectors. So the 4-gradient is the "archetypal" one-form.

=== As part of the total proper time derivative ===
The scalar product of 4-velocity $U^\mu$ with the 4-gradient gives the total derivative with respect to proper time $\frac{d}{d\tau}$:
$$\begin{align}
\mathbf{U} \cdot \boldsymbol{\partial}
&= U^\mu \eta_{\mu\nu} \partial^\nu = \gamma \left(c, \vec{u}\right) \cdot \left(\frac{\partial_t}{c}, -\vec{\nabla}\right) = \gamma \left(c \frac{\partial_t}{c} + \vec{u} \cdot \vec{\nabla} \right) = \gamma \left(\partial_t + \frac{dx}{dt} \partial_x + \frac{dy}{dt} \partial_y + \frac{dz}{dt} \partial_z \right) = \gamma \frac{d}{dt} = \frac{d}{d\tau} \\
\frac{d}{d\tau}
&= \frac{dX^\mu}{dX^\mu} \frac{d}{d\tau} = \frac{dX^\mu}{d\tau} \frac{d}{dX^\mu} = U^\mu \partial_\mu = \mathbf{U} \cdot \boldsymbol{\partial}
\end{align}$$

The fact that $\mathbf{U} \cdot \boldsymbol{\partial}$ is a Lorentz scalar invariant shows that the total derivative with respect to proper time $\frac{d}{d\tau}$ is likewise a Lorentz scalar invariant.

So, for example, the 4-velocity $U^\mu$ is the derivative of the 4-position $X^\mu$ with respect to proper time:
$$\frac{d}{d\tau} \mathbf{X} = (\mathbf{U} \cdot \boldsymbol{\partial})\mathbf{X} = \mathbf{U} \cdot \boldsymbol{\partial}[\mathbf{X}] = U^\alpha \cdot \eta^{\mu\nu} = U^\alpha \eta_{\alpha \nu} \eta^{\mu\nu} = U^\alpha \delta_\alpha^\mu = U^\mu = \mathbf{U}$$
or
$$\frac{d}{d\tau} \mathbf{X} = \gamma\frac{d}{dt} \mathbf{X} = \gamma\frac{d}{dt} \left(ct, \vec{x}\right) = \gamma \left(\frac{d}{dt}ct,\frac{d}{dt}\vec{x}\right) = \gamma \left(c, \vec{u}\right) = \mathbf{U}$$

Another example, the 4-acceleration $A^\mu$ is the proper-time derivative of the 4-velocity $U^\mu$:
$$\begin{align}
\frac{d}{d\tau} \mathbf{U}
&= (\mathbf{U} \cdot \boldsymbol{\partial})\mathbf{U} = \mathbf{U} \cdot \boldsymbol{\partial}[\mathbf{U}] = U^\alpha \eta_{\alpha\mu}\partial^\mu\left[U^\nu\right] \\
&= U^\alpha \eta_{\alpha\mu}\begin{bmatrix} \frac{\partial_t}{c} \gamma c & \frac{\partial_t}{c} \gamma \vec{u} \\ -\vec{\nabla}\gamma c & -\vec{\nabla}\gamma \vec{u} \end{bmatrix} = U^\alpha \begin{bmatrix}\ \frac{\partial_t}{c} \gamma c & 0 \\ 0 & \vec{\nabla}\gamma \vec{u} \end{bmatrix} \\[3pt]
&= \gamma \left(c \frac{\partial_t}{c} \gamma c, \vec{u} \cdot \nabla\gamma \vec{u}\right) = \gamma \left(c \partial_t \gamma, \frac{d}{dt}\left[\gamma \vec{u}\right]\right) = \gamma \left(c \dot{\gamma}, \dot{\gamma} \vec{u} + \gamma \dot{\vec{u}}\right) = \mathbf{A}
\end{align}$$

or
$$\frac{d}{d\tau} \mathbf{U} = \gamma \frac{d}{dt} (\gamma c,\gamma \vec{u}) =\gamma \left(\frac{d}{dt} [\gamma c],\frac{d}{dt} [\gamma \vec{u}] \right) = \gamma (c \dot{\gamma}, \dot{\gamma} \vec{u} + \gamma \dot{\vec{u}} ) = \mathbf{A}$$

=== As a way to define the Faraday electromagnetic tensor and derive the Maxwell equations ===
The Faraday electromagnetic tensor $F^{\mu\nu}$ is a mathematical object that describes the electromagnetic field in spacetime of a physical system.

Applying the 4-gradient to make an antisymmetric tensor, one gets:
$$F^{\mu\nu} = \partial^\mu A^\nu - \partial^\nu A^\mu =
\begin{bmatrix}
0     & -E_x/c & -E_y/c & -E_z/c \\
E_x/c & 0      & -B_z   & B_y    \\
E_y/c & B_z    & 0      & -B_x   \\
E_z/c & -B_y   & B_x    & 0
\end{bmatrix}$$
where:

- Electromagnetic 4-potential $A^\mu = \mathbf{A} = \left(\frac{\phi}{c}, \vec{\mathbf{a}}\right)$, not to be confused with the 4-acceleration $\mathbf{A} = \gamma \left(c \dot{\gamma}, \dot{\gamma} \vec{u} + \gamma \dot{\vec{u}}\right)$
- The electric scalar potential is $\phi$
- The magnetic 3-space vector potential is $\vec{\mathbf{a}}$

By applying the 4-gradient again, and defining the 4-current density as $J^{\beta} = \mathbf{J} = \left(c\rho, \vec{\mathbf{j}}\right)$ one can derive the tensor form of the Maxwell equations:
$$\partial_{\alpha} F^{\alpha\beta} = \mu_o J^{\beta}$$
$$\partial_\gamma F_{ \alpha \beta } + \partial_\alpha F_{ \beta \gamma } + \partial_\beta F_{ \gamma \alpha } = 0_{\alpha \beta \gamma}$$
where the second line is a version of the Bianchi identity (Jacobi identity).

=== As a way to define the 4-wavevector ===
A wavevector is a vector which helps describe a wave. Like any vector, it has a magnitude and direction, both of which are important: Its magnitude is either the wavenumber or angular wavenumber of the wave (inversely proportional to the wavelength), and its direction is ordinarily the direction of wave propagation

The 4-wavevector $K^\mu$ is the 4-gradient of the negative phase $\Phi$ (or the negative 4-gradient of the phase) of a wave in Minkowski Space:
$$K^\mu = \mathbf{K} = \left(\frac{\omega}{c}, \vec{\mathbf{k}}\right) = \boldsymbol{\partial} [-\Phi] = -\boldsymbol{\partial} [\Phi]$$

This is mathematically equivalent to the definition of the phase of a wave (or more specifically a plane wave):
$$\mathbf{K} \cdot \mathbf{X} = \omega t - \vec{\mathbf{k}} \cdot \vec{\mathbf{x}} = -\Phi$$

where 4-position $\mathbf{X} = \left(ct, \vec{\mathbf{x}}\right)$, $\omega$ is the temporal angular frequency, $\vec{\mathbf{k}}$ is the spatial 3-space wavevector, and $\Phi$ is the Lorentz scalar invariant phase.

$$\partial [\mathbf{K} \cdot \mathbf{X}] = \partial \left[\omega t - \vec{\mathbf{k}} \cdot \vec{\mathbf{x}}\right] = \left(\frac{\partial_t}{c}, -\nabla\right)\left[\omega t - \vec{\mathbf{k}} \cdot \vec{\mathbf{x}}\right] = \left(\frac{\partial_t}{c}\left[\omega t - \vec{\mathbf{k}} \cdot \vec{\mathbf{x}}\right], -\nabla\left[\omega t - \vec{\mathbf{k}} \cdot \vec{\mathbf{x}}\right]\right) = \left(\frac{\partial_t}{c}[\omega t], -\nabla\left[- \vec{\mathbf{k}} \cdot \vec{\mathbf{x}}\right]\right) = \left(\frac{\omega}{c}, \vec{\mathbf{k}}\right) = \mathbf{K}$$
with the assumption that the plane wave $\omega$ and $\vec{\mathbf{k}}$ are not explicit functions of $t$ or $\vec{\mathbf{x}}$.

The explicit form of an SR plane wave $\Psi_n(\mathbf{X})$ can be written as:

$$\Psi_n(\mathbf{X}) = A_ne^{-i(\mathbf{K_n}\cdot\mathbf{X})} = A_ne^{i(\Phi_n)}$$
where $A_n$ is a (possibly complex) amplitude.

A general wave $\Psi(\mathbf{X})$ would be the superposition of multiple plane waves:
$$\Psi(\mathbf{X}) = \sum_{ n }[\Psi_n(\mathbf{X})] = \sum_{ n }\left[A_{n} e^{-i(\mathbf{K_n}\cdot \mathbf{X})}\right] = \sum_{ n }\left[A_{n} e^{i(\Phi_n)}\right]$$

Again using the 4-gradient,
$$\partial [\Psi(\mathbf{X})] = \partial\left[Ae^{-i(\mathbf{K}\cdot\mathbf{X})}\right] = -i\mathbf{K} \left[Ae^{-i(\mathbf{K}\cdot\mathbf{X})}\right] = -i\mathbf{K} [\Psi(\mathbf{X})]$$
or
$$\boldsymbol{\partial} = -i \mathbf{K}$$
which is the 4-gradient version of complex-valued plane waves

=== As the d'Alembertian operator ===
In special relativity, electromagnetism and wave theory, the d'Alembert operator, also called the d'Alembertian or the wave operator, is the Laplace operator of Minkowski space. The operator is named after French mathematician and physicist Jean le Rond d'Alembert.

The square of $\boldsymbol{\partial}$ is the 4-Laplacian, which is called the d'Alembert operator:

$$\boldsymbol{\partial} \cdot \boldsymbol{\partial} = \partial^\mu \cdot \partial^\nu =  \partial^\mu \eta_{\mu\nu} \partial^\nu = \partial_\nu \partial^\nu = \frac{1}{c^2}\frac{\partial^2}{\partial t^2} - \vec{\nabla}^2 = \left(\frac{\partial_t}{c}\right)^2 - \vec{\nabla}^2.$$

As it is the dot product of two 4-vectors, the d'Alembertian is a Lorentz invariant scalar.

Occasionally, in analogy with the 3-dimensional notation, the symbols $\Box$ and $\Box^2$ are used for the 4-gradient and d'Alembertian respectively. More commonly however, the symbol $\Box$ is reserved for the d'Alembertian.

Some examples of the 4-gradient as used in the d'Alembertian follow:

In the Klein–Gordon relativistic quantum wave equation for spin-0 particles (ex. Higgs boson):
$$\left[(\boldsymbol{\partial} \cdot \boldsymbol{\partial}) + \left(\frac{m_0 c}{\hbar}\right)^2\right]\psi = \left[\left(\frac{\partial_t^2}{c^2} - \vec{\nabla}^2\right) + \left(\frac{m_0 c}{\hbar}\right)^2\right]\psi = 0$$

In the wave equation for the electromagnetic field (using Lorenz gauge $(\boldsymbol{\partial} \cdot \mathbf{A}) = \left(\partial_\mu A^\mu\right) = 0$):

- In vacuum:
  $$(\boldsymbol{\partial} \cdot \boldsymbol{\partial}) \mathbf{A} = (\boldsymbol{\partial} \cdot \boldsymbol{\partial}) A^{\alpha} = \mathbf{0} = 0^{\alpha}$$
- With a 4-current source, not including the effects of spin:
  $$(\boldsymbol{\partial} \cdot \boldsymbol{\partial}) \mathbf{A} = (\boldsymbol{\partial} \cdot \boldsymbol{\partial}) A^{\alpha} = \mu_0 \mathbf{J} = \mu_0 J^{\alpha}$$
- With quantum electrodynamics source, including effects of spin:
  $$(\boldsymbol{\partial} \cdot \boldsymbol{\partial}) \mathbf{A} = (\boldsymbol{\partial} \cdot \boldsymbol{\partial}) A^{\alpha} = e\bar{\psi} \gamma^{\alpha} \psi$$

where:

- Electromagnetic 4-potential $\mathbf{A} = A^{\alpha} = \left(\frac{\phi}{c}, \mathbf{\vec{a}}\right)$ is an electromagnetic vector potential
- 4-current density $\mathbf{J} = J^{\alpha} = \left(\rho c, \mathbf{\vec{j}}\right)$ is an electromagnetic current density
- Dirac Gamma matrices $\gamma^\alpha = \left(\gamma^0, \gamma^1, \gamma^2, \gamma^3\right)$ provide the effects of spin

In the wave equation of a gravitational wave (using a similar Lorenz gauge $\left(\partial_\mu h^{\mu\nu}_{TT}\right) = 0$)
$$(\boldsymbol{\partial} \cdot \boldsymbol{\partial}) h^{\mu\nu}_{TT} = 0$$
where $h^{\mu\nu}_{TT}$ is the transverse traceless 2-tensor representing gravitational radiation in the weak-field limit (i.e. freely propagating far from the source).

Further conditions on $h^{\mu\nu}_{TT}$ are:

- Purely spatial:
  $$\mathbf{U} \cdot h^{\mu\nu}_{TT} = h^{0\nu}_{TT} = 0$$
- Traceless:
  $$\eta_{\mu\nu} h^{\mu\nu}_{TT} = h^{\nu}_{TT\nu} = 0$$
- Transverse:
  $$\boldsymbol{\partial} \cdot h^{\mu\nu}_{TT} = \partial_\mu h^{\mu\nu}_{TT} = 0$$

In the 4-dimensional version of Green's function:
$$(\boldsymbol{\partial} \cdot \boldsymbol{\partial}) G\left[\mathbf{X} - \mathbf{X'}\right] = \delta^{(4)}\left[\mathbf{X} - \mathbf{X'}\right]$$
where the 4D Delta function is:
$$\delta^{(4)}[\mathbf{X}] = \frac{1}{(2 \pi)^4} \int d^4 \mathbf{K} e^{-i(\mathbf{K} \cdot \mathbf{X})}$$

=== As a component of the 4D Gauss' Theorem / Stokes' Theorem / Divergence Theorem ===
In vector calculus, the divergence theorem, also known as Gauss's theorem or Ostrogradsky's theorem, is a result that relates the flow (that is, flux) of a vector field through a surface to the behavior of the vector field inside the surface. More precisely, the divergence theorem states that the outward flux of a vector field through a closed surface is equal to the volume integral of the divergence over the region inside the surface. Intuitively, it states that the sum of all sources minus the sum of all sinks gives the net flow out of a region. In vector calculus, and more generally differential geometry, Stokes' theorem (also called the generalized Stokes' theorem) is a statement about the integration of differential forms on manifolds, which both simplifies and generalizes several theorems from vector calculus.

$$\int_\Omega d^4X \left(\partial_\mu V^\mu\right) = \oint_{\partial \Omega} dS \left(V^\mu N_\mu\right)$$
or
$$\int_\Omega d^4X \left(\boldsymbol{\partial} \cdot \mathbf{V}\right) = \oint_{\partial \Omega} dS \left(\mathbf{V} \cdot \mathbf{N}\right)$$
where

- $\mathbf{V} = V^\mu$ is a 4-vector field defined in $\Omega$
- $\boldsymbol{\partial}\cdot\mathbf{V} = \partial_\mu V^\mu$ is the 4-divergence of $V$
- $\mathbf{V}\cdot\mathbf{N} = V^\mu N_\mu$ is the component of $V$ along direction $N$
- $\Omega$ is a 4D simply connected region of Minkowski spacetime
- $\partial \Omega = S$ is its 3D boundary with its own 3D volume element $dS$
- $\mathbf{N} = N^\mu$ is the outward-pointing normal
- $d^4X = (c\,dt) \left(d^3x\right) = (c\,dt) (dx\,dy\,dz)$ is the 4D differential volume element

=== As a component of the SR Hamilton–Jacobi equation in relativistic analytic mechanics ===
The Hamilton–Jacobi equation (HJE) is a formulation of classical mechanics, equivalent to other formulations such as Newton's laws of motion, Lagrangian mechanics and Hamiltonian mechanics. The Hamilton–Jacobi equation is particularly useful in identifying conserved quantities for mechanical systems, which may be possible even when the mechanical problem itself cannot be solved completely. The HJE is also the only formulation of mechanics in which the motion of a particle can be represented as a wave. In this sense, the HJE fulfilled a long-held goal of theoretical physics (dating at least to Johann Bernoulli in the 18th century) of finding an analogy between the propagation of light and the motion of a particle

The generalized relativistic momentum $\mathbf{P_T}$ of a particle can be written as
$$\mathbf{P_T} = \mathbf{P} + q\mathbf{A}$$
where $\mathbf{P} = \left(\frac{E}{c}, \vec{\mathbf{p}}\right)$ and $\mathbf{A} = \left(\frac{\phi}{c}, \vec{\mathbf{a}}\right)$

This is essentially the 4-total momentum $\mathbf{P_T} = \left(\frac{E_T}{c}, \vec{\mathbf{p_T}}\right)$ of the system; a test particle in a field using the minimal coupling rule. There is the inherent momentum of the particle $\mathbf{P}$, plus momentum due to interaction with the EM 4-vector potential $\mathbf{A}$ via the particle charge $q$.

The relativistic Hamilton–Jacobi equation is obtained by setting the total momentum equal to the negative 4-gradient of the action $S$.
$$\mathbf{P_T} = -\boldsymbol{\partial} [S] = \left(\frac{E_T}{c}, \vec{\mathbf{p_T}}\right) = \left(\frac{H}{c}, \vec{\mathbf{p_T}}\right) = -\boldsymbol{\partial} [S] = -\left(\frac{\partial_t}{c}, -\vec{\boldsymbol{\nabla}}\right)[S]$$

The temporal component gives: $E_T = H = -\partial_t[S]$

The spatial components give: $\vec{\mathbf{p_T}} = \vec{\boldsymbol{\nabla}}[S]$

where $H$ is the Hamiltonian.

This is actually related to the 4-wavevector being equal the negative 4-gradient of the phase from above. $K^\mu = \mathbf{K} = \left(\frac{\omega}{c}, \vec{\mathbf{k}}\right) = -\boldsymbol{\partial} [\Phi]$

To get the HJE, one first uses the Lorentz scalar invariant rule on the 4-momentum:
$$\mathbf{P} \cdot \mathbf{P} = (m_0 c)^2$$

But from the minimal coupling rule:
$$\mathbf{P} = \mathbf{P_T} - q\mathbf{A}$$

So:
$$\begin{align}
\left(\mathbf{P_T} - q\mathbf{A}\right) \cdot \left(\mathbf{P_T} - q\mathbf{A}\right) =
\left(\mathbf{P_T} - q\mathbf{A}\right)^2 &= \left(m_0 c\right)^2 \\
\Rightarrow \left(-\boldsymbol{\partial}[S] - q\mathbf{A}\right)^2 &= \left(m_0 c\right)^2
\end{align}$$

Breaking into the temporal and spatial components:
$$\begin{align}
&& \left(-\frac{\partial_t[S]}{c} - \frac{q \phi}{c}\right)^2 - (\boldsymbol{\nabla}[S] - q \mathbf{a})^2 &= (m_0 c)^2 \\
&\Rightarrow & (\boldsymbol{\nabla}[S] - q \mathbf{a})^2 - \frac{1}{c^2}(-\partial_t[S] - q \phi)^2 + (m_0 c)^2 &= 0 \\
&\Rightarrow &  (\boldsymbol{\nabla}[S] - q \mathbf{a})^2 - \frac{1}{c^2}(\partial_t[S] + q \phi)^2 + (m_0 c)^2 &= 0
\end{align}$$

where the final is the relativistic Hamilton–Jacobi equation.

=== As a component of the Schrödinger relations in quantum mechanics ===
The 4-gradient is connected with quantum mechanics.

The relation between the 4-momentum $\mathbf{P}$ and the 4-gradient $\boldsymbol{\partial}$ gives the Schrödinger QM relations.
$$\mathbf{P} = \left(\frac{E}{c}, \vec{p}\right) = i\hbar \boldsymbol{\partial} = i\hbar \left(\frac{\partial_t}{c}, -\vec{\nabla}\right)$$

The temporal component gives: $E = i\hbar \partial_t$

The spatial components give: $\vec{p} = -i\hbar \vec{\nabla}$

This can actually be composed of two separate steps.

First:

$$\mathbf{P} = \left(\frac{E}{c},\vec{p}\right) = \hbar \mathbf{K} = \hbar \left(\frac{\omega}{c},\vec{k}\right)$$
which is the full 4-vector version of:

The (temporal component) Planck–Einstein relation $E = \hbar \omega$

The (spatial components) de Broglie matter wave relation $\vec{p} = \hbar \vec{k}$

Second:

$$\mathbf{K} = \left(\frac{\omega}{c},\vec{k}\right) = i \boldsymbol{\partial} = i \left(\frac{\partial_t}{c}, -\vec{\nabla}\right)$$
which is just the 4-gradient version of the wave equation for complex-valued plane waves

The temporal component gives: $\omega = i \partial_t$

The spatial components give: $\vec{k} = - i \vec{\nabla}$

=== As a component of the covariant form of the quantum commutation relation ===
In quantum mechanics (physics), the canonical commutation relation is the fundamental relation between canonical conjugate quantities (quantities which are related by definition such that one is the Fourier transform of another).

- According to:
  $$\left[P^\mu, X^\nu\right] = i \hbar \left[\partial^\mu, X^\nu\right] = i \hbar \partial^\mu\left[X^\nu\right] = i \hbar \eta^{\mu \nu}$$
- Taking the spatial components,
  $$\left[p^j, x^k\right] = i \hbar \eta^{j k}$$
- Since $\eta^{\mu \nu} = \operatorname{diag}[1,-1,-1,-1]$,
  $$\left[p^j, x^k\right] = - i \hbar \delta^{j k}$$
- Since $[a, b] = -[b, a]$,
  $$\left[x^k, p^j\right] = i \hbar \delta^{k j}$$
- And, relabeling indices gives the usual quantum commutation rules:
  $$\left[x^j, p^k\right] = i \hbar \delta^{j k}$$

=== As a component of the wave equations and probability currents in relativistic quantum mechanics ===
The 4-gradient is a component in several of the relativistic wave equations:

In the Klein–Gordon relativistic quantum wave equation for spin-0 particles (ex. Higgs boson):
$$\left[\left(\partial^\mu \partial_\mu\right) + \left(\frac{m_0 c}{\hbar}\right)^2\right]\psi = 0$$

In the Dirac relativistic quantum wave equation for spin-1/2 particles (ex. electrons):
$$\left[i \gamma^\mu \partial_\mu - \frac{m_0 c}{\hbar}\right] \psi = 0$$

where $\gamma^\mu$ are the Dirac gamma matrices and $\psi$ is a relativistic wave function.

$\psi$ is Lorentz scalar for the Klein–Gordon equation, and a spinor for the Dirac equation.

It is nice that the gamma matrices themselves refer back to the fundamental aspect of SR, the Minkowski metric:
$$\left\{\gamma^\mu, \gamma^\nu\right\} = \gamma^\mu \gamma^\nu + \gamma^\nu \gamma^\mu = 2 \eta^{\mu\nu}I_4$$

Conservation of 4-probability current density follows from the continuity equation:
$$\boldsymbol{\partial} \cdot \mathbf{J} = \partial_t \rho + \vec{\boldsymbol{\nabla}} \cdot \vec{\mathbf{j}} = 0$$

The 4-probability current density has the relativistically covariant expression:
$$J_\text{prob}^\mu = \frac{i\hbar}{2m_0}\left(\psi^* \partial^\mu\psi - \psi\partial^\mu \psi^*\right)$$

The 4-charge current density is just the charge (q) times the 4-probability current density:
$$J_\text{charge}^\mu = \frac{i\hbar q}{2m_0}\left(\psi^* \partial^\mu\psi - \psi\partial^\mu\psi^*\right)$$

=== As a key component in deriving quantum mechanics and relativistic quantum wave equations from special relativity ===
Relativistic wave equations use 4-vectors in order to be covariant.

Start with the standard SR 4-vectors:

- 4-position $\mathbf{X} = \left(ct, \vec{\mathbf{x}}\right)$
- 4-velocity $\mathbf{U} = \gamma\left(c, \vec{\mathbf{u}}\right)$
- 4-momentum $\mathbf{P} = \left(\frac{E}{c}, \vec{\mathbf{p}}\right)$
- 4-wavevector $\mathbf{K} = \left(\frac{\omega}{c}, \vec{\mathbf{k}}\right)$
- 4-gradient $\boldsymbol{\partial} = \left(\frac{\partial_t}{c}, -\vec{\boldsymbol{\nabla}}\right)$

Note the following simple relations from the previous sections, where each 4-vector is related to another by a Lorentz scalar:

- 4-velocity $\mathbf{U} = \frac{d}{d\tau} \mathbf{X}$, where $\tau$ is the proper time
- 4-momentum $\mathbf{P} = m_0 \mathbf{U}$, where $m_0$ is the rest mass
- 4-wavevector $\mathbf{K} = \frac{1}{\hbar} \mathbf{P}$, which is the 4-vector version of the Planck–Einstein relation & the de Broglie matter wave relation
- 4-gradient $\boldsymbol{\partial} = -i \mathbf{K}$, which is the 4-gradient version of complex-valued plane waves

Now, just apply the standard Lorentz scalar product rule to each one:
$$\begin{align}
\mathbf{U} \cdot \mathbf{U} &= c^2 \\
\mathbf{P} \cdot \mathbf{P} &= (m_0 c)^2 \\
\mathbf{K} \cdot \mathbf{K} &= \left(\frac{m_0 c}{\hbar}\right)^2 \\
\boldsymbol{\partial} \cdot \boldsymbol{\partial} &= \left(\frac{-i m_0 c}{\hbar}\right)^2 = -\left(\frac{m_0 c}{\hbar}\right)^2
\end{align}$$

The last equation (with the 4-gradient scalar product) is a fundamental quantum relation.

When applied to a Lorentz scalar field $\psi$, one gets the Klein–Gordon equation, the most basic of the quantum relativistic wave equations:
$$\left[\boldsymbol{\partial} \cdot \boldsymbol{\partial} + \left(\frac{m_0 c}{\hbar}\right)^2\right]\psi = 0$$

The Schrödinger equation is the low-velocity limiting case (|v| ≪ c) of the Klein–Gordon equation.

If the quantum relation is applied to a 4-vector field $A^\mu$ instead of a Lorentz scalar field $\psi$, then one gets the Proca equation:
$$\left[\boldsymbol{\partial} \cdot \boldsymbol{\partial} + \left(\frac{m_0 c}{\hbar}\right)^2\right]A^\mu = 0^\mu$$

If the rest mass term is set to zero (light-like particles), then this gives the free Maxwell equation:
$$[\boldsymbol{\partial} \cdot \boldsymbol{\partial}]A^\mu = 0^\mu$$

More complicated forms and interactions can be derived by using the minimal coupling rule:

=== As a component of the RQM covariant derivative (internal particle spaces) ===
In modern elementary particle physics, one can define a gauge covariant derivative which utilizes the extra RQM fields (internal particle spaces) now known to exist.

The version known from classical EM (in natural units) is:
$$D^\mu = \partial^\mu - i g A^\mu$$

The full covariant derivative for the fundamental interactions of the Standard Model that we are presently aware of (in natural units) is:

$$D^\mu = \partial^\mu - i g_1 \frac{1}{2} Y B^\mu - i g_2 \frac{1}{2}\tau_i \cdot W_i^\mu - i g_3 \frac{1}{2} \lambda_a \cdot G_a^\mu$$
or
$$\mathbf{D} = \boldsymbol{\partial} - i g_1 \frac{1}{2} Y \mathbf{B} - i g_2 \frac{1}{2} \boldsymbol{\tau}_i \cdot \mathbf{W}_i - i g_3 \frac{1}{2} \boldsymbol{\lambda}_a \cdot \mathbf{G}_a$$

where the scalar product summations ($\cdot$) here refer to the internal spaces, not the tensor indices:

- $B^\mu$ corresponds to U(1) invariance = (1) EM force gauge boson
- $W_i^\mu$ corresponds to SU(2) invariance = (3) weak force gauge bosons (i = 1, …, 3)
- $G_a^\mu$ corresponds to SU(3) invariance = (8) color force gauge bosons (a = 1, …, 8)

The coupling constants $(g_1, g_2, g_3)$ are arbitrary numbers that must be discovered from experiment. It is worth emphasizing that for the non-abelian transformations once the $g_i$ are fixed for one representation, they are known for all representations.

These internal particle spaces have been discovered empirically.

== Derivation ==
In three dimensions, the gradient operator maps a scalar field to a vector field such that the line integral between any two points in the vector field is equal to the difference between the scalar field at these two points. Based on this, it may appear incorrectly that the natural extension of the gradient to 4 dimensions should be:
$$\partial^\alpha \overset{?}{=} \left( \frac{\partial}{\partial t}, \vec{\nabla} \right),$$
which is incorrect.

However, a line integral involves the application of the vector dot product, and when this is extended to 4-dimensional spacetime, a change of sign is introduced to either the spatial co-ordinates or the time co-ordinate depending on the convention used. This is due to the non-Euclidean nature of spacetime. In this article, we place a negative sign on the spatial coordinates (the time-positive metric convention $\eta^{\mu\nu} = \operatorname{diag}[1,-1,-1,-1]$). The factor of (1/c) is to keep the correct unit dimensionality, [length]^{−1}, for all components of the 4-vector and the (−1) is to keep the 4-gradient Lorentz covariant. Adding these two corrections to the above expression gives the correct definition of 4-gradient:
$$\partial^\alpha = \left(\frac{1}{c} \frac{\partial}{\partial t}, -\vec{\nabla} \right)$$

== See also ==
- Four-vector
- Four-position
- Four-velocity
- Four-acceleration
- Four-momentum
- Four-force
- Four-current
- Four-potential
- Four-frequency
- Four-wavevector
- Four-spin
- Ricci calculus
- Index notation
- Tensor
- Antisymmetric tensor
- Einstein notation
- Raising and lowering indices
- Abstract index notation
- Covariance and contravariance of vectors
