= Four-momentum =

4D relativistic energy and momentum

In special relativity, four-momentum (also called momentum–energy or momenergy) is the generalization of the classical three-dimensional momentum to four-dimensional spacetime. Momentum is a vector in three dimensions; similarly four-momentum is a four-vector in spacetime. The contravariant four-momentum of a particle with relativistic energy E and three-momentum p = (p_{x}, p_{y}, p_{z}) = γmv, where v is the particle's three-velocity and γ the Lorentz factor, is
$$p = \left(p^0 , p^1 , p^2 , p^3\right) = \left(\frac E c , p_x , p_y , p_z\right).$$

The quantity mv of above is the ordinary non-relativistic momentum of the particle and m its rest mass. The four-momentum is useful in relativistic calculations because it is a Lorentz covariant vector. This means that it is easy to keep track of how it transforms under Lorentz transformations.

== Minkowski norm ==
Calculating the Minkowski norm squared of the four-momentum gives a Lorentz invariant quantity equal (up to factors of the speed of light c) to the square of the particle's proper mass:

$$p \cdot p = \eta_{\mu\nu} p^\mu p^\nu = p_\nu p^\nu = -{E^2 \over c^2} + |\mathbf p|^2 = -m^2 c^2$$
where the following denote:

$p$, the four-momentum vector of a particle,

$p \cdot p$, the Minkowski inner product of the four-momentum with itself,

$p^\mu$and $p^\nu$, the contravariant components of the four-momentum vector,

$p_\nu$, the covariant form,

$E$, the energy of the particle,

$c$, the speed of light,

$|\mathbf p|$, the magnitude of the four-momentum vector,

$m$, the invariant mass (rest) of the particle,

and
$$\eta_{\mu\nu} = \begin{pmatrix}
-1 & 0 & 0 & 0\\
0 & 1 & 0 & 0\\
0 & 0 & 1 & 0\\
0 & 0 & 0 & 1
\end{pmatrix}$$
is the metric tensor of special relativity with metric signature for definiteness chosen to be (–1, 1, 1, 1). The negativity of the norm reflects that the momentum is a timelike four-vector for massive particles. The other choice of signature would flip signs in certain formulas (like for the norm here). This choice is not important, but once made it must for consistency be kept throughout.

The Minkowski norm is Lorentz invariant, meaning its value is not changed by Lorentz transformations/boosting into different frames of reference. More generally, for any two four-momenta p and q, the quantity p ⋅ q is invariant.

== Relation to four-velocity ==
For a massive particle, the four-momentum is given by the particle's invariant mass m multiplied by the particle's four-velocity,
$$p^\mu = m u^\mu,$$
where the four-velocity u is
$$u = \left(u^0 , u^1 , u^2 , u^3\right) = \gamma_v \left(c , v_x , v_y , v_z\right),$$
and
$$\gamma_v := \frac{1}{\sqrt{1 - \frac{v^2}{c^2}}}$$
is the Lorentz factor (associated with the speed $v$), c is the speed of light.

== Derivation ==
There are several ways to arrive at the correct expression for four-momentum. One way is to first define the four-velocity u = dx/dτ and simply define p = mu, being content that it is a four-vector with the correct units and correct behavior. Another, more satisfactory, approach is to begin with the principle of least action and use the Lagrangian framework to derive the four-momentum, including the expression for the energy. One may at once, using the observations detailed below, define four-momentum from the action S. Given that in general for a closed system with generalized coordinates q_{i} and canonical momenta p_{i},
$$p_i = \frac{\partial S}{\partial q_i} = \frac{\partial S}{\partial x_i}, \quad E = -\frac{\partial S}{\partial t} = - c \cdot \frac{\partial S}{\partial x^{0}},$$
it is immediate (recalling x^{0} = ct, x^{1} = x, x^{2} = y, x^{3} = z and x_{0} = −x^{0}, x_{1} = x^{1}, x_{2} = x^{2}, x_{3} = x^{3} in the present metric convention) that
$$p_\mu =\frac{\partial S}{\partial x^\mu} = \left(-{E \over c}, \mathbf p\right)$$
is a covariant four-vector with the three-vector part being the canonical momentum.

Observations

Consider initially a system of one degree of freedom q. In the derivation of the equations of motion from the action using Hamilton's principle, one finds (generally) in an intermediate stage for the variation of the action,
$$\delta S = \left. \left[ \frac{\partial L}{\partial \dot q}\delta q\right]\right|_{t_1}^{t_2} + \int_{t_1}^{t_2} \left( \frac{\partial L}{\partial q} - \frac{d}{dt} \frac{\partial L}{\partial \dot q}\right)\delta q dt.$$

The assumption is then that the varied paths satisfy δq(t_{1}) = δq(t_{2}) = 0, from which Lagrange's equations follow at once. When the equations of motion are known (or simply assumed to be satisfied), one may let go of the requirement δq(t_{2}) = 0. In this case the path is assumed to satisfy the equations of motion, and the action is a function of the upper integration limit δq(t_{2}), but t_{2} is still fixed. The above equation becomes with S = S(q), and defining δq(t_{2}) = δq, and letting in more degrees of freedom,
$$\delta S = \sum_i \frac{\partial L}{\partial \dot{q}_i}\delta q_i = \sum_i p_i \delta q_i.$$

Observing that
$$\delta S = \sum_i \frac{\partial S}{\partial {q}_i}\delta q_i,$$
one concludes
$$p_i = \frac{\partial S}{\partial q_i}.$$

In a similar fashion, keep endpoints fixed, but let t_{2} = t vary. This time, the system is allowed to move through configuration space at "arbitrary speed" or with "more or less energy", the field equations still assumed to hold and variation can be carried out on the integral, but instead observe
$$\frac{dS}{dt} = L$$
by the fundamental theorem of calculus. Compute using the above expression for canonical momenta,
$$\frac{dS}{dt} = \frac{\partial S}{\partial t} + \sum_i \frac{\partial S}{\partial q_i}\dot{q}_i =
\frac{\partial S}{\partial t} + \sum_i p_i\dot{q}_i = L.$$

Now using
$$H = \sum_i p_i \dot{q}_i - L,$$
where H is the Hamiltonian, leads to, since E = H in the present case,
$$E = H = -\frac{\partial S}{\partial t}.$$

Incidentally, using H = H(q, p, t) with p = ∂S/∂q in the above equation yields the Hamilton–Jacobi equations. In this context, S is called Hamilton's principal function.

The action S is given by
$$S = -mc\int ds = \int L dt, \quad L = -mc^2\sqrt{1 - \frac{v^2}{c^2}},$$
where L is the relativistic Lagrangian for a free particle. From this,

glossing over these details,

The variation of the action is
$$\delta S = -mc\int \delta ds.$$

To calculate δds, observe first that δds^{2} = 2dsδds and that
$$\delta ds^2
= \delta \eta_{\mu\nu}dx^\mu dx^\nu
= \eta_{\mu\nu} \left(\delta \left(dx^\mu\right) dx^\nu + dx^\mu \delta \left(dx^\nu\right)\right)
= 2\eta_{\mu\nu} \delta \left(dx^\mu\right) dx^\nu.$$

So
$$\delta ds = \eta_{\mu\nu} \delta dx^\mu \frac{dx^\nu}{ds} = \eta_{\mu\nu} d\delta x^\mu \frac{dx^\nu}{ds},$$
or
$$\delta ds = \eta_{\mu\nu} \frac{d\delta x^\mu}{d\tau} \frac{dx^\nu}{cd\tau}d\tau,$$
and thus
$$\delta S =
-m\int \eta_{\mu\nu} \frac{d\delta x^\mu}{d\tau} \frac{dx^\nu}{d\tau}d\tau =
-m\int \eta_{\mu\nu} \frac{d\delta x^\mu}{d\tau} u^\nu d\tau =
-m\int \eta_{\mu\nu} \left[\frac{d}{d\tau} \left(\delta x^\mu u^\nu\right) - \delta x^\mu\frac{d}{d\tau}u^\nu\right] d\tau$$
which is just
$$\delta S = \left[-mu_\mu\delta x^\mu\right]_{t_1}^{t_2} + m \int_{t_1}^{t_2} \delta x^\mu\frac{du_\mu}{ds}ds$$

$$\delta S = \left[ -mu_\mu\delta x^\mu\right]_{t_1}^{t_2} + m\int_{t_1}^{t_2}\delta x^\mu\frac{du_\mu}{ds}ds = -mu_\mu\delta x^\mu = \frac{\partial S}{\partial x^\mu}\delta x^\mu = -p_\mu\delta x^\mu,$$

where the second step employs the field equations du^{μ}/ds = 0, (δx^{μ})_{t_{1}} = 0, and (δx^{μ})_{t_{2}} ≡ δx^{μ} as in the observations above. Now compare the last three expressions to find
$$p^\mu = \partial^\mu[S] = \frac{\partial S}{\partial x_\mu} = mu^\mu = m\left(\frac{c}{\sqrt{1 - \frac{v^2}{c^2}}}, \frac{v_x}{\sqrt{1 - \frac{v^2}{c^2}}}, \frac{v_y}{\sqrt{1 - \frac{v^2}{c^2}}}, \frac{v_z}{\sqrt{1 - \frac{v^2}{c^2}}}\right),$$
with norm −m^{2}c^{2}, and the famed result for the relativistic energy,

$E = \frac{mc^2}{\sqrt{1 - \frac{v^2}{c^2}}} = m_{r}c^2,$

where m_{r} is the now unfashionable relativistic mass, follows. By comparing the expressions for momentum and energy directly, one has

$\mathbf p = E\frac{\mathbf v}{c^2},$

that holds for massless particles as well. Squaring the expressions for energy and three-momentum and relating them gives the energy–momentum relation,

$\frac{E^2}{c^2} = \mathbf p \cdot \mathbf p + m^2c^2.$

Substituting
$$p_\mu \leftrightarrow -\frac{\partial S}{\partial x^\mu}$$
in the equation for the norm gives the relativistic Hamilton–Jacobi equation,

$\eta^{\mu\nu}\frac{\partial S}{\partial x^\mu}\frac{\partial S}{\partial x^\nu} = -m^2c^2.$

It is also possible to derive the results from the Lagrangian directly. By definition,
$$\begin{align}
\mathbf p &= \frac{\partial L}{\partial \mathbf v}
= \left({\partial L\over \partial \dot x}, {\partial L\over\partial \dot y}, {\partial L\over\partial \dot z}\right)
= m(\gamma v_x, \gamma v_y, \gamma v_z) = m\gamma \mathbf v
= m \mathbf u , \\[3pt]
E &= \mathbf p \cdot \mathbf v - L = \frac{mc^2}{\sqrt{1 - \frac{v^2}{c^2}}},
\end{align}$$
which constitute the standard formulae for canonical momentum and energy of a closed (time-independent Lagrangian) system. With this approach it is less clear that the energy and momentum are parts of a four-vector.

The energy and the three-momentum are separately conserved quantities for isolated systems in the Lagrangian framework. Hence four-momentum is conserved as well. More on this below.

More pedestrian approaches include expected behavior in electrodynamics. In this approach, the starting point is application of Lorentz force law and Newton's second law in the rest frame of the particle. The transformation properties of the electromagnetic field tensor, including invariance of electric charge, are then used to transform to the lab frame, and the resulting expression (again Lorentz force law) is interpreted in the spirit of Newton's second law, leading to the correct expression for the relativistic three-momentum. The disadvantage, of course, is that it isn't immediately clear that the result applies to all particles, whether charged or not, and that it doesn't yield the complete four-vector.

It is also possible to avoid electromagnetism and use well tuned experiments of thought involving well-trained physicists throwing billiard balls, utilizing knowledge of the velocity addition formula and assuming conservation of momentum. This too gives only the three-vector part.

== Conservation of four-momentum ==
As shown above, there are three conservation laws (not independent, the last two imply the first and vice versa):

- The four-momentum p (either covariant or contravariant) is conserved.
- The total energy E = p^{0}c is conserved.
- The 3-space momentum $\mathbf{p} = \left(p^1, p^2, p^3\right)$ is conserved (not to be confused with the classic non-relativistic momentum $m\mathbf{v}$).

Note that the invariant mass of a system of particles may be more than the sum of the particles' rest masses, since kinetic energy in the system center-of-mass frame and potential energy from forces between the particles contribute to the invariant mass. As an example, two particles with four-momenta (5 GeV/c, 4 GeV/c, 0, 0) and (5 GeV/c, −4 GeV/c, 0, 0) each have (rest) mass 3 GeV/c^{2} separately, but their total mass (the system mass) is 10 GeV/c^{2}. If these particles were to collide and stick, the mass of the composite object would be 10 GeV/c^{2}.

One practical application from particle physics of the conservation of the invariant mass involves combining the four-momenta p_{A} and p_{B} of two daughter particles produced in the decay of a heavier particle with four-momentum p_{C} to find the mass of the heavier particle. Conservation of four-momentum gives p_{C}^{μ} = p_{A}^{μ} + p_{B}^{μ}, while the mass M of the heavier particle is given by −P_{C} ⋅ P_{C} = M^{2}c^{2}. By measuring the energies and three-momenta of the daughter particles, one can reconstruct the invariant mass of the two-particle system, which must be equal to M. This technique is used, e.g., in experimental searches for Z′ bosons at high-energy particle colliders, where the Z′ boson would show up as a bump in the invariant mass spectrum of electron–positron or muon–antimuon pairs.

If the mass of an object does not change, the Minkowski inner product of its four-momentum and corresponding four-acceleration A^{μ} is simply zero. The four-acceleration is proportional to the proper time derivative of the four-momentum divided by the particle's mass, so
$$p^\mu A_\mu = \eta_{\mu\nu} p^\mu A^\nu = \eta_{\mu\nu} p^\mu \frac{d}{d\tau} \frac{p^{\nu}}{m} = \frac{1}{2m} \frac{d}{d\tau} p \cdot p = \frac{1}{2m} \frac{d}{d\tau} \left(-m^2c^2\right) = 0 .$$

== Canonical momentum in the presence of an electromagnetic potential ==
For a charged particle of charge q, moving in an electromagnetic field given by the electromagnetic four-potential:
$$A = \left(A^0 , A^1 , A^2 , A^3\right) = \left({\phi \over  c}, A_x , A_y , A_z\right)$$
where ϕ is the scalar potential and A = (A_{x}, A_{y}, A_{z}) the vector potential, the components of the (not gauge-invariant) canonical momentum four-vector P is
$$P^\mu = p^\mu + q A^\mu.$$

This, in turn, allows the potential energy from the charged particle in an electrostatic potential and the Lorentz force on the charged particle moving in a magnetic field to be incorporated in a compact way, in relativistic quantum mechanics.

== Four-momentum in curved spacetime ==
In the case when there is a moving physical system with a continuous distribution of matter in curved spacetime, the primary expression for four-momentum is a four-vector with covariant index:

$$P_\mu = \left(\frac {E} {c} , -\mathbf P \right).$$

Note that this expression now uses the metric convention $\eta_{\mu \nu} = \text{diag}(1,-1,-1,-1)$, opposite the convention given above. Four-momentum $P_\mu$ is expressed through the energy $E$ of physical system and relativistic momentum $\mathbf P$. At the same time, the four-momentum $P_\mu$ can be represented as the sum of two non-local four-vectors of integral type:

$$P_\mu = p_\mu + K_\mu.$$

Four-vector $p_\mu$ is the generalized four-momentum associated with the action of fields on particles; four-vector $K_\mu$ is the four-momentum of the fields arising from the action of particles on the fields.

Energy $E$ and momentum $\mathbf P$, as well as components of four-vectors $p_\mu$ and $K_\mu$ can be calculated if the Lagrangian density $\mathcal{L} =\mathcal{L}_p + \mathcal{L}_f$ of the system is given. The following formulas are obtained for the energy and momentum of the system:

$$E = \int_{V} \frac {\partial}{\partial \mathbf v} \left( \frac { \mathcal{L}_p }{u^0} \right) \cdot \mathbf v u^0 \sqrt {-g} dx^1 dx^2 dx^3 -\int_{V} \left (\mathcal{L}_p  + \mathcal{L}_f  \right ) \sqrt {-g} dx^1 dx^2 dx^3 +\sum_{n=1}^N \left( \mathbf v_n \cdot \frac {\partial L_f}{\partial \mathbf v_n}\right )  .$$

$$\mathbf P = \int_{V} \frac {\partial}{\partial \mathbf v} \left( \frac { \mathcal{L}_p }{u^0} \right) u^0 \sqrt {-g} dx^1 dx^2 dx^3 +\sum_{n=1}^N \frac {\partial L_f}{\partial \mathbf v_n} .$$

Here $\mathcal{L}_p$ is that part of the Lagrangian density that contains terms with four-currents; $\mathbf v$ is the velocity of matter particles; $u^0$ is the time component of four-velocity of particles; $g$ is determinant of metric tensor; $L_f = \int_{V} \mathcal{L}_f \sqrt {-g} dx^1 dx^2 dx^3$ is the part of the Lagrangian associated with the Lagrangian density $\mathcal{ L}_f$; $\mathbf v_n$ is velocity of a particle of matter with number $n$.

== See also ==
- Four-force
- Four-gradient
- Pauli–Lubanski pseudovector
