= Four-force =

4-dimensional analogue of force used in theories of relativity

In the special theory of relativity, four-force is a four-vector that replaces the classical force.

== In special relativity ==
The four-force is defined as the rate of change in the four-momentum of a particle with respect to the particle's proper time. Hence,:

$$\mathbf{F} = {\mathrm{d}\mathbf{P} \over \mathrm{d}\tau}.$$

For a particle of constant invariant mass $m > 0$, the four-momentum is given by the relation $\mathbf{P} = m\mathbf{U}$, where $\mathbf{U}=\gamma(c,\mathbf{u})$ is the four-velocity. In analogy to Newton's second law, we can also relate the four-force to the four-acceleration, $\mathbf{A}$, by equation:

$$\mathbf{F} = m\mathbf{A} = \left(\gamma {\mathbf{f}\cdot\mathbf{u} \over c},\gamma{\mathbf f}\right).$$

Here

$${\mathbf f}={\mathrm{d} \over \mathrm{d}t} \left(\gamma m {\mathbf u} \right)={\mathrm{d}\mathbf{p} \over \mathrm{d}t}$$

and

$${\mathbf{f}\cdot\mathbf{u}}={\mathrm{d} \over \mathrm{d}t} \left(\gamma mc^2 \right)={\mathrm{d}E \over \mathrm{d}t} .$$

where $\mathbf{u}$, $\mathbf{p}$ and $\mathbf{f}$ are 3-space vectors describing the velocity, the momentum of the particle and the force acting on it respectively; and $E$ is the total energy of the particle.

== Including thermodynamic interactions ==
From the formulae of the previous section it appears that the time component of the four-force is the power expended, $\mathbf{f}\cdot\mathbf{u}$, apart from relativistic corrections $\gamma/c$. This is only true in purely mechanical situations, when heat exchanges vanish or can be neglected.

In the full thermo-mechanical case, not only work, but also heat contributes to the change in energy, which is the time component of the energy–momentum covector. The time component of the four-force includes in this case a heating rate $h$, besides the power $\mathbf{f}\cdot\mathbf{u}$. Note that work and heat cannot be meaningfully separated, though, as they both carry inertia. This fact extends also to contact forces, that is, to the stress–energy–momentum tensor.

Therefore, in thermo-mechanical situations the time component of the four-force is not proportional to the power $\mathbf{f}\cdot\mathbf{u}$ but has a more generic expression, to be given case by case, which represents the supply of internal energy from the combination of work and heat, and which in the Newtonian limit becomes $h + \mathbf{f} \cdot \mathbf{u}$.

== In general relativity ==
In general relativity the relation between four-force, and four-acceleration remains the same, but the elements of the four-force are related to the elements of the four-momentum through a covariant derivative with respect to proper time.

$$F^\lambda := \frac{DP^\lambda }{d\tau} = \frac{dP^\lambda }{d\tau } + \Gamma^\lambda {}_{\mu \nu}U^\mu P^\nu$$

In addition, we can formulate force using the concept of coordinate transformations between different coordinate systems. Assume that we know the correct expression for force in a coordinate system at which the particle is momentarily at rest. Then we can perform a transformation to another system to get the corresponding expression of force. In special relativity the transformation will be a Lorentz transformation between coordinate systems moving with a relative constant velocity whereas in general relativity it will be a general coordinate transformation.

Consider the four-force $F^\mu=(F^0, \mathbf{F})$ acting on a particle of mass $m$ which is momentarily at rest in a coordinate system. The relativistic force $f^\mu$ in another coordinate system moving with constant velocity $v$, relative to the other one, is obtained using a Lorentz transformation:

$$\begin{align}
\mathbf{f} &= \mathbf{F} + (\gamma - 1) \mathbf{v} {\mathbf{v}\cdot\mathbf{F} \over v^2}, \\
f^0 &= \gamma \boldsymbol{\beta}\cdot\mathbf{F} = \boldsymbol{\beta}\cdot\mathbf{f}.
\end{align}$$

where $\boldsymbol{\beta} = \mathbf{v}/c$.

In general relativity, the expression for force becomes

$$f^\mu = m {DU^\mu\over d\tau}$$

with covariant derivative $D/d\tau$. The equation of motion becomes

$$m {d^2 x^\mu\over d\tau^2} = f^\mu - m \Gamma^\mu_{\nu\lambda} {dx^\nu \over d\tau} {dx^\lambda \over d\tau},$$

where $\Gamma^\mu_{\nu\lambda}$ is the Christoffel symbol. If there is no external force, this becomes the equation for geodesics in the curved space-time. The second term in the above equation, plays the role of a gravitational force. If $f^\alpha_f$ is the correct expression for force in a freely falling frame $\xi^\alpha$, we can use then the equivalence principle to write the four-force in an arbitrary coordinate $x^\mu$:

$$f^\mu = {\partial x^\mu \over \partial\xi^\alpha} f^\alpha_f.$$

== Examples ==
In special relativity, Lorentz four-force (four-force acting on a charged particle situated in an electromagnetic field) can be expressed as:
$$f_\mu = q F_{\mu\nu} U^\nu ,$$

where

- $F_{\mu\nu}$ is the electromagnetic tensor,
- $U^\nu$ is the four-velocity, and
- $q$ is the electric charge.

== See also ==
- four-vector
- four-velocity
- four-acceleration
- four-momentum
- four-gradient
