= Four-velocity =

Analogue of velocity in four-dimensional spacetime

In physics, in particular in special relativity and general relativity, a four-velocity is a four-vector in four-dimensional spacetime (Note: Technically, the four-vector should be thought of as residing in the tangent space of a point in spacetime, spacetime itself being modeled as a smooth manifold. This distinction is significant in general relativity.) that represents the relativistic counterpart of velocity, which is a three-dimensional vector in space.

Physical events correspond to mathematical points in time and space, the set of all of them together forming a mathematical model of physical four-dimensional spacetime. The history of an object traces a curve in spacetime, called its world line. If the object has mass, so that its speed is necessarily less than the speed of light, the world line may be parametrized by the proper time of the object. The four-velocity is the rate of change of four-position with respect to the proper time along the curve. The velocity, in contrast, is the rate of change of the position in (three-dimensional) space of the object, as seen by an observer, with respect to the observer's time.

The value of the magnitude of an object's four-velocity, i.e. the quantity obtained by applying the metric tensor g to the four-velocity U, that is ‖U‖^{2} = U ⋅ U = g_{μν}U^{ν}U^{μ}, is always equal to ±c^{2}, where c is the speed of light. Whether the plus or minus sign applies depends on the choice of metric signature. For an object at rest its four-velocity is parallel to the direction of the time coordinate with U^{0} = c. A four-velocity is thus the normalized future-directed timelike tangent vector to a world line, and is a contravariant vector. Though it is a vector, addition of two four-velocities does not yield a four-velocity: the space of four-velocities is not itself a vector space. (Note: The set of four-velocities is a subset of the tangent space (which is a vector space) at an event. The label four-vector stems from the behavior under Lorentz transformations, namely under which particular representation they transform.)

== Velocity ==
The path of an object in three-dimensional space (in an inertial frame) may be expressed in terms of three spatial coordinate functions x^{i}(t) of time t, where i is an index which takes values 1, 2, 3.

The three coordinates form the 3d position vector, written as a column vector
$$\vec{x}(t) = \begin{bmatrix} x^1(t) \\[0.7ex] x^2(t) \\[0.7ex] x^3(t) \end{bmatrix} \, .$$

The components of the velocity $\vec{u}$ (tangent to the curve) at any point on the world line are

$$\vec{u} = \begin{bmatrix} u^1 \\ u^2 \\ u^3 \end{bmatrix} = \frac{d \vec{x}}{dt} =
\begin{bmatrix} \tfrac{dx^1}{dt} \\ \tfrac{dx^2}{dt} \\ \tfrac{dx^3}{dt} \end{bmatrix}.$$

Each component is simply written
$$u^i = \frac{dx^i}{dt}$$

== Theory of relativity ==
In Einstein's theory of relativity, the path of an object moving relative to a particular frame of reference is defined by four coordinate functions x^{μ}(τ), where μ is a spacetime index which takes the value 0 for the timelike component, and 1, 2, 3 for the spacelike coordinates. The zeroth component is defined as the time coordinate multiplied by c,
$$x^0 = ct\,,$$

Each function depends on one parameter τ called its proper time. As a column vector,
$$\mathbf{x} = \begin{bmatrix}
x^0(\tau) \\ x^1(\tau) \\ x^2(\tau) \\ x^3(\tau) \\
\end{bmatrix}\,.$$

=== Time dilation ===
From time dilation, the differentials in coordinate time t and proper time τ are related by
$$dt = \gamma(u) d\tau$$
where the Lorentz factor,
$$\gamma(u) = \frac{1}{\sqrt{1-\frac{u^2}{c^2}}}\,,$$
is a function of the Euclidean norm u of the 3d velocity vector $\vec{u}$:
$$u =  \left\|\ \vec{u}\ \right\| = \sqrt{ \left(u^1\right)^2 + \left(u^2\right)^2 + \left(u^3\right)^2} \,.$$

=== Definition of the four-velocity ===
The four-velocity is the tangent four-vector of a timelike world line. The four-velocity $\mathbf{U}$ at any point of world line $\mathbf{X}(\tau)$ is defined as:
$$\mathbf{U} = \frac{d\mathbf{X}}{d \tau}$$
where $\mathbf{X}$ is the four-position and $\tau$ is the proper time.

The four-velocity defined here using the proper time of an object does not exist for world lines for massless objects such as photons travelling at the speed of light; nor is it defined for tachyonic world lines, where the tangent vector is spacelike.

=== Components of the four-velocity ===
The relationship between the time t and the coordinate time x^{0} is defined by
$$x^0 = ct .$$

Taking the derivative of this with respect to the proper time τ, we find the U^{μ} velocity component for μ = 0:
$$U^0 = \frac{dx^0}{d\tau} = \frac{d(ct)}{d\tau} = c\frac{dt}{d\tau} = c \gamma(u)$$

and for the other 3 components to proper time we get the U^{μ} velocity component for μ = 1, 2, 3:
$$U^i = \frac{dx^i}{d\tau} =
\frac{dx^i}{dt} \frac{dt}{d\tau} =
\frac{dx^i}{dt} \gamma(u) =
\gamma(u) u^i$$
where we have used the chain rule and the relationships
$$u^i = {dx^i \over dt } \,,\quad \frac{dt}{d\tau} = \gamma (u)$$

Thus, we find for the four-velocity $\mathbf{U}$:
$$\mathbf{U} = \gamma \begin{bmatrix} c \\ \vec{u} \\ \end{bmatrix}.$$

Written in standard four-vector notation this is:
$$\mathbf{U} = \gamma \left(c, \vec{u}\right) = \left(\gamma c, \gamma \vec{u}\right)$$
where $\gamma c$ is the temporal component and $\gamma \vec{u}$ is the spatial component.

In terms of the synchronized clocks and rulers associated with a particular slice of flat spacetime, the three spacelike components of four-velocity define a traveling object's proper velocity $\gamma \vec{u} = d\vec{x} / d\tau$ i.e. the rate at which distance is covered in the reference map frame per unit proper time elapsed on clocks traveling with the object.

Unlike most other four-vectors, the four-velocity has only 3 independent components $u_x, u_y, u_z$ instead of 4. The $\gamma$ factor is a function of the three-dimensional velocity $\vec{u}$.

When certain Lorentz scalars are multiplied by the four-velocity, one then gets new physical four-vectors that have 4 independent components.

For example:

- Four-momentum:
  $$\mathbf{P} = m_o\mathbf{U} = \gamma m_o\left(c, \vec{u}\right) = m\left(c, \vec{u}\right) = \left(mc, m\vec{u}\right) = \left(mc, \vec{p}\right) = \left(\frac{E}{c},\vec{p}\right),$$
  where $m_o$ is the rest mass
- Four-current density:
  $$\mathbf{J} = \rho_o\mathbf{U} = \gamma \rho_o\left(c, \vec{u}\right) = \rho\left(c, \vec{u}\right) = \left(\rho c, \rho\vec{u}\right) = \left(\rho c, \vec{j}\right) ,$$
  where $\rho_o$ is the charge density

Effectively, the $\gamma$ factor combines with the Lorentz scalar term to make the 4th independent component
$$m = \gamma m_o$$
and
$$\rho = \gamma \rho_o.$$

=== Magnitude ===
Using the differential of the four-position in the rest frame, the magnitude of the four-velocity can be obtained by the Minkowski metric with signature (−, +, +, +):
$$\left\|\mathbf{U}\right\|^2 = \eta_{\mu\nu} U^\mu U^\nu = \eta_{\mu\nu} \frac{dX^\mu}{d\tau} \frac{dX^\nu}{d\tau} = - c^2 \,,$$
in short, the magnitude of the four-velocity for any object is always a fixed constant:
$$\left\|\mathbf{U}\right\|^2 = - c^2$$

In a moving frame, the same norm is:
$$\left\|\mathbf{U}\right\|^2 = {\gamma(u)}^2 \left( - c^2 + \vec{u} \cdot \vec{u} \right) ,$$
so that:
$$- c^2 = {\gamma(u)}^2 \left( - c^2 + \vec{u} \cdot \vec{u} \right) ,$$

which reduces to the definition of the Lorentz factor.

== See also ==
- Four-acceleration
- Four-momentum
- Four-force
- Four-gradient
- Algebra of physical space
- Congruence (general relativity)
- Hyperboloid model
- Rapidity
