= Rindler coordinates =

Tool from special relativity

Rindler coordinates are a coordinate system used to describe the hyperbolic acceleration of a uniformly accelerating reference frame in flat spacetime. The coordinates of a hyperbolically accelerated reference frame constitute a useful coordinate chart representing flat Minkowski spacetime. In special relativity, a uniform acceleration results in hyperbolic motion, for which a uniformly accelerating frame of reference in which it is at rest can be chosen as its proper reference frame. The phenomena in this frame can be compared to effects arising in a homogeneous gravitational field.

Historically, such coordinates were introduced soon after the advent of special relativity, when they were studied (fully or partially) alongside the concept of hyperbolic motion: In relation to flat Minkowski spacetime by Albert Einstein (1907, 1912), (Note: Einstein, Albert (1908) [1907], "Über das Relativitätsprinzip und die aus demselben gezogenen Folgerungen" (PDF), Jahrbuch der Radioaktivität und Elektronik, 4: 411–462, Bibcode:1908JRE.....4..411E; English translation On the relativity principle and the conclusions drawn from it at Einstein paper project. Einstein, Albert (1912), "Lichtgeschwindigkeit und Statik des Gravitationsfeldes", Annalen der Physik, 343 (7): 355–369, Bibcode:1912AnP...343..355E, doi:10.1002/andp.19123430704, English translation The Speed of Light and the Statics of the Gravitational Field at Einstein paper project.) Max Born (1909), Arnold Sommerfeld (1910), Max von Laue (1911), Hendrik Lorentz (1913), Friedrich Kottler (1914), Wolfgang Pauli (1921), (Note: Pauli, W. (1921). "Die Relativitätstheorie". Encyclopädie der mathematischen Wissenschaften. Vol. 5. Leipzig, B.G. Teubner. pp. 539–776. New edition 2013: Editor: Domenico Giulini, Springer, 2013 ISBN 3642583555.) Karl Bollert (1922), Stjepan Mohorovičić (1922), Georges Lemaître (1924), Einstein & Nathan Rosen (1935), Christian Møller (1943, 1952), Fritz Rohrlich (1963), Harry Lass (1963), and in relation to both flat and curved spacetime of general relativity by Wolfgang Rindler (1960, 1966). For details and sources, see § History.

== Formulation ==
In this article, the speed of light is defined by c = 1, the inertial coordinates are (X, Y, Z, T), and the hyperbolic coordinates are (x, y, z, t). These hyperbolic coordinates can be separated into two main variants depending on the accelerated observer's position: If the observer is located at time T = 0 at position X = 1/α (with α as the constant proper acceleration measured by a comoving accelerometer), then the hyperbolic coordinates are often called Rindler coordinates with the corresponding Rindler metric. If the observer is located at time T = 0 at position X = 0, then the hyperbolic coordinates are sometimes called Møller coordinates or Kottler–Møller coordinates with the corresponding Kottler–Møller metric. An alternative chart often related to observers in hyperbolic motion is obtained using Radar coordinates which are sometimes called Lass coordinates. Both the Kottler–Møller coordinates as well as Lass coordinates are denoted as Rindler coordinates as well.

== Characteristics of the Rindler frame ==
Rindler chart, for $\alpha=0.5$ in equation (1a), plotted on a Minkowski diagram. The dashed lines are the Rindler horizons

The worldline of a body in hyperbolic motion having constant proper acceleration $\alpha$ in the $X$-direction as a function of proper time $\tau$ and rapidity $\alpha\tau$ can be given by

$$T=x\sinh(\alpha\tau),\quad X=x\cosh(\alpha\tau)$$

where $x=1/\alpha$ is constant and $\alpha\tau$ is variable, with the worldline resembling the hyperbola $X^{2}-T^{2}=x^2$. Sommerfeld showed that the equations can be reinterpreted by defining $x$ as variable and $\alpha\tau$ as constant, so that it represents the simultaneous "rest shape" of a body in hyperbolic motion measured by a comoving observer. By using the proper time of the observer as the time of the entire hyperbolically accelerated frame by setting $\tau=t$, the transformation formulas between the inertial coordinates and the hyperbolic coordinates are consequently:

$T=x\sinh(\alpha t),\quad X=x\cosh(\alpha t),\quad Y=y,\quad Z=z$	1a

with the inverse

$$t=\frac{1}{\alpha}\operatorname{artanh}\left(\frac{T}{X}\right),\quad x=\sqrt{X^{2}-T^{2}},\quad y=Y,\quad z=Z$$

Differentiated and inserted into the Minkowski metric

$$\mathrm ds^{2}=-\mathrm dT^{2}+\mathrm dX^{2}+\mathrm dY^{2}+\mathrm dZ^{2},$$

the metric in the hyperbolically accelerated frame follows as

$\mathrm{d}s^{2}=-(\alpha x)^{2}\mathrm{d}t^{2}+\mathrm{d}x^{2}+\mathrm{d}y^{2}+\mathrm{d}z^{2}.$	1b

These transformations define the Rindler observer as an observer that is "at rest" in Rindler coordinates, i.e., maintaining constant x, y, z, and only varying t as time passes. The coordinates are valid in the region $0 < X < \infty,\; -X < T < X$, which is often called the Rindler wedge, if $\alpha$ represents the proper acceleration (along the hyperbola $x=1 / \alpha$) of the Rindler observer whose proper time is defined to be equal to Rindler coordinate time. To maintain this world line, the observer must accelerate with a constant proper acceleration, with Rindler observers closer to $x=0$ (the Rindler horizon) having greater proper acceleration. All the Rindler observers are instantaneously at rest at time $T=0$ in the inertial frame, and at this time a Rindler observer with proper acceleration $\alpha_{i}$ will be at position $X=1/\alpha_{i}$ (really $X=c^{2}/\alpha_{i}$, but we assume units where $c=1$), which is also that observer's constant distance from the Rindler horizon in Rindler coordinates. If all Rindler observers set their clocks to zero at $T=0$, then when defining a Rindler coordinate system we have a choice of which Rindler observer's proper time will be equal to the coordinate time $t$ in Rindler coordinates, and this observer's proper acceleration defines the value of $\alpha$ above (for other Rindler observers at different distances from the Rindler horizon, the coordinate time will equal some constant multiple of their own proper time). It is a common convention to define the Rindler coordinate system so that the Rindler observer whose proper time matches coordinate time is the one who has proper acceleration $\alpha=1$, so that $\alpha$ can be eliminated from the equations.

The above equation has been simplified for $c=1$. The unsimplified equation is more convenient for finding the Rindler Horizon distance, given an acceleration $\alpha$.

$$\begin{align}
&t =\frac{c}{\alpha}\operatorname{artanh}\left(\frac{cT}{X}\right)\;\overset{X\,\gg\,cT}{\approx}\;\frac{c^2 T}{\alpha X} \\
&\Rightarrow X \approx\frac{c^2 T}{\alpha t}\;\overset{T\,\approx\,t}{\approx}\;\frac{c^2}{\alpha}
\end{align}$$

The remainder of the article will follow the convention of setting both $\alpha=1$ and $c=1$, so units for $X$ and $x$ will be 1 unit $=c^{2}/\alpha=1$. Be mindful that setting $\alpha=1$ light-second/second^{2} is very different from setting $\alpha=1$ light-year/year^{2}. Even if we pick units where $c=1$, the magnitude of the proper acceleration $\alpha$ will depend on our choice of units: for example, if we use units of light-years for distance, ($X$ or $x$) and years for time, ($T$ or $t$), this would mean $\alpha=1$ light year/year^{2}, equal to about 9.5 meters/second^{2}, while if we use units of light-seconds for distance, ($X$ or $x$), and seconds for time, ($T$ or $t$), this would mean $\alpha=1$ light-second/second^{2}, or 299 792 458 meters/second^{2}).

== Variants of transformation formulas ==
A more general derivation of the transformation formulas is given, when the corresponding Fermi–Walker tetrad is formulated from which the Fermi coordinates or Proper coordinates can be derived. Depending on the choice of origin of these coordinates, one can derive the metric, the time dilation between the time at the origin $dt_{0}$ and $dt$ at point $x$, and the coordinate light speed $|dx|/|dt|$ (this variable speed of light does not contradict special relativity, because it is only an artifact of the accelerated coordinates employed, while in inertial coordinates it remains constant). Instead of Fermi coordinates, also Radar coordinates can be used, which are obtained by determining the distance using light signals (see section Notions of distance), by which metric, time dilation and speed of light do not depend on the coordinates anymore – in particular, the coordinate speed of light remains identical with the speed of light $(c=1)$ in inertial frames:

$X$ at $T=0$	Transformation, Metric, Time dilation and Coordinate speed of light
$X=0$	Kottler–Møller coordinates (Note: Kottler (1914b), pp. 488-489, 492-493)
$X=0$	$$\begin{array}{c|c} \begin{align}T & =\left(x+\frac{1}{\alpha}\right)\sinh(\alpha t)\\ X & =\left(x+\frac{1}{\alpha}\right)\cosh(\alpha t)-\frac{1}{\alpha}\\ Y & =y\\ Z & =z \end{align} & \begin{align} t & =\frac{1}{\alpha}\operatorname{artanh}\left(\frac{T}{X+\frac{1}{\alpha}}\right)\\ x & =\sqrt{\left(X+\frac{1}{\alpha}\right)^{2}-T^{2}}-\frac{1}{\alpha}\\ y & =Y\\ z & =Z \end{align} \end{array}$$ / 2a; $ds^{2}=-(1+\alpha x){}^{2}d t^{2}+dx^{2}+dy^{2}+dz^{2}$ / 2b; $d t=(1+\alpha x)d t_{0},\qquad\frac{|dx|}{|d t|}=1+\alpha x$ / 2c
	Rindler coordinates
$X=\frac{1}{\alpha}$	$$\begin{array}{c|c} \begin{align}T & =x\sinh(\alpha t)\\ X & =x\cosh(\alpha t)\\ Y & =y\\ Z & =z \end{align} & \begin{align} t & =\frac{1}{\alpha}\operatorname{artanh}\frac{T}{X}\\ x & =\sqrt{X^{2}-T^{2}}\\ y & =Y\\ z & =Z \end{align} \end{array}$$ / 2d; $ds^{2}=-(\alpha x)^{2}d t^{2}+dx^{2}+dy^{2}+dz^{2}$ / 2e; $dt=\alpha x\ d t_{0},\qquad\frac{|dx|}{|d t|}=\alpha x$ / 2f
	Radar coordinates (Lass coordinates)
$X=\frac{1}{\alpha}$	$$\begin{array}{c|c} \begin{align}T & =\frac{1}{\alpha}e^{\alpha x}\sinh(\alpha t)\\ X & =\frac{1}{\alpha}e^{\alpha x}\cosh(\alpha t)\\ Y & =y\\ Z & =z \end{align} & \begin{align} t & =\frac{1}{\alpha}\operatorname{artanh}\frac{T}{X}\\ x & =\frac{1}{2\alpha}\ln\left[\alpha{}^{2}\left(X^{2}-T^{2}\right)\right]\\ y & =Y\\ z & =Z \end{align} \end{array}$$ / 2g
$X=\frac{1}{\alpha}$	$ds^{2}=e^{2\alpha x}\left(-d t^{2}+dx^{2}\right)+dy^{2}+dz^{2}$ / 2h; $d t=e^{\alpha x}d t_{0},\qquad\frac{|dx|}{|d t|}=1$ / 2i

== The Rindler observers ==
In the new chart (1a) with $c=1$ and $\alpha=1$, it is natural to take the coframe field

$$d\sigma^0 = x \, dt,\;\; d\sigma^1 = dx,\;\; d\sigma^2 = dy,\;\; d\sigma^3 = dz$$

which has the dual frame field

$$\vec{e}_0 = \frac{1}{x}\partial_t,\;\; \vec{e}_1 = \partial_x,\;\; \vec{e}_2 = \partial_y,\;\; \vec{e}_3 = \partial_z$$

This defines a local Lorentz frame in the tangent space at each event (in the region covered by our Rindler chart, namely the Rindler wedge). The integral curves of the timelike unit vector field $\vec{e}_0$ give a timelike congruence, consisting of the world lines of a family of observers called the Rindler observers. In the Rindler chart, these world lines appear as the vertical coordinate lines $x = x_0,\; y = y_0,\; z = z_0$. Using the coordinate transformation above, we find that these correspond to hyperbolic arcs in the original Cartesian chart.

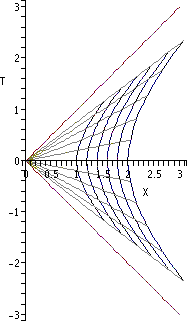
Some representative Rindler observers (navy blue hyperbolic arcs) depicted using the Cartesian chart. The red lines at 45 degrees from the vertical represent the Rindler horizon; the Rindler coordinate system is only defined to the right of this boundary.

As with any timelike congruence in any Lorentzian manifold, this congruence has a kinematic decomposition (see Raychaudhuri equation). In this case, the expansion and vorticity of the congruence of Rindler observers vanish. The vanishing of the expansion tensor implies that each of our observers maintains constant distance to his neighbors. The vanishing of the vorticity tensor implies that the world lines of our observers are not twisting about each other; this is a kind of local absence of "swirling".

The acceleration vector of each observer is given by the covariant derivative

$$\nabla_{\vec{e}_0} \vec{e}_0 = \frac{1}{x}\vec{e}_1$$

That is, each Rindler observer is accelerating in the $\partial_x$ direction. Individually speaking, each observer is in fact accelerating with constant magnitude in this direction, so their world lines are the Lorentzian analogs of circles, which are the curves of constant path curvature in the Euclidean geometry.

Because the Rindler observers are vorticity-free, they are also hypersurface orthogonal. The orthogonal spatial hyperslices are $t = t_0$; these appear as horizontal half-planes in the Rindler chart and as half-planes through $T = X = 0$ in the Cartesian chart (see the figure above). Setting $dt = 0$ in the line element, we see that these have the ordinary Euclidean geometry, $d\sigma^2 = dx^2 + dy^2 + dz^2,\; \forall x > 0, \forall y, z$. Thus, the spatial coordinates in the Rindler chart have a very simple interpretation consistent with the claim that the Rindler observers are mutually stationary. We will return to this rigidity property of the Rindler observers a bit later in this article.

== A "paradoxical" property ==
Note that Rindler observers with smaller constant x coordinate are accelerating harder to keep up. This may seem surprising because in Newtonian physics, observers who maintain constant relative distance must share the same acceleration. But in relativistic physics, we see that the trailing endpoint of a rod which is accelerated by some external force (parallel to its symmetry axis) must accelerate a bit harder than the leading endpoint, or else it must ultimately break. This is a manifestation of Lorentz contraction. As the rod accelerates, its velocity increases and its length decreases. Since it is getting shorter, the back end must accelerate harder than the front. Another way to look at it is: the back end must achieve the same change in velocity in a shorter period of time. This leads to a differential equation showing that, at some distance, the acceleration of the trailing end diverges, resulting in the Rindler horizon.

This phenomenon is the basis of a well known "paradox", Bell's spaceship paradox. However, it is a simple consequence of relativistic kinematics. One way to see this is to observe that the magnitude of the acceleration vector is just the path curvature of the corresponding world line. But the world lines of our Rindler observers are the analogs of a family of concentric circles in the Euclidean plane, so we are simply dealing with the Lorentzian analog of a fact familiar to speed skaters: in a family of concentric circles, inner circles must bend faster (per unit arc length) than the outer ones.

== Minkowski observers ==
A representative Minkowski observer (navy blue hyperbolic secant curve) depicted using the Rindler chart. The Rindler horizon is shown in red.

It is worthwhile to also introduce an alternative frame, given in the Minkowski chart by the natural choice

$$\vec{f}_0 = \partial_T, \; \vec{f}_1 = \partial_X, \; \vec{f}_2 = \partial_Y, \; \vec{f}_3 = \partial_Z$$

Transforming these vector fields using the coordinate transformation given above, we find that in the Rindler chart (in the Rindler wedge) this frame becomes

$$\begin{align}
\vec{f}_0 &=  \frac{1}{x}\cosh(t) \, \partial_t - \sinh(t) \, \partial_x\\
\vec{f}_1 &= -\frac{1}{x}\sinh(t) \, \partial_t + \cosh(t) \, \partial_x\\
\vec{f}_2 &= \partial_y, \; \vec{f}_3 = \partial_z
\end{align}$$

Computing the kinematic decomposition of the timelike congruence defined by the timelike unit vector field $\vec{f}_0$, we find that the expansion and vorticity again vanishes, and in addition the acceleration vector vanishes, $\nabla_{\vec{f}_0} \vec{f}_0 = 0$. In other words, this is a geodesic congruence; the corresponding observers are in a state of inertial motion. In the original Cartesian chart, these observers, whom we will call Minkowski observers, are at rest.

In the Rindler chart, the world lines of the Minkowski observers appear as hyperbolic secant curves asymptotic to the coordinate plane $x = 0$. Specifically, in Rindler coordinates, the world line of the Minkowski observer passing through the event $t = t_0,\; x = x_0,\; y = y_0,\; z = z_0$ is

$$\begin{align}
t &= \operatorname{artanh}\left(\frac{s}{x_0}\right),\; -x_0 < s < x_0\\
x &= \sqrt{x_0^2-s^2},\; -x_0 < s < x_0\\
y &= y_0\\
z &= z_0
\end{align}$$

where $s$ is the proper time of this Minkowski observer. Note that only a small portion of his history is covered by the Rindler chart. This shows explicitly why the Rindler chart is not geodesically complete; timelike geodesics run outside the region covered by the chart in finite proper time. Of course, we already knew that the Rindler chart cannot be geodesically complete, because it covers only a portion of the original Cartesian chart, which is a geodesically complete chart.

In the case depicted in the figure, $x_0 = 1$ and we have drawn (correctly scaled and boosted) the light cones at $s \in \left\{-\frac{1}{2},\; 0,\; \frac{1}{2}\right\}$.

== The Rindler horizon ==
The Rindler coordinate chart has a coordinate singularity at x = 0, where the metric tensor (expressed in the Rindler coordinates) has vanishing determinant. This happens because as x → 0 the acceleration of the Rindler observers diverges. As we can see from the figure illustrating the Rindler wedge, the locus x = 0 in the Rindler chart corresponds to the locus T^{2} = X^{2}, X > 0 in the Cartesian chart, which consists of two null half-planes, each ruled by a null geodesic congruence.

For the moment, we simply consider the Rindler horizon as the boundary of the Rindler coordinates. If we consider the set of accelerating observers who have a constant position in Rindler coordinates, none of them can ever receive light signals from events with T ≥ X (on the diagram, these would be events on or to the left of the line T = X which the upper red horizon lies along; these observers could however receive signals from events with T ≥ X if they stopped their acceleration and crossed this line themselves) nor could they have ever sent signals to events with T ≤ −X (events on or to the left of the line T = −X which the lower red horizon lies along; those events lie outside all future light cones of their past world line). Also, if we consider members of this set of accelerating observers closer and closer to the horizon, in the limit as the distance to the horizon approaches zero, the constant proper acceleration experienced by an observer at this distance (which would also be the G-force experienced by such an observer) would approach infinity. Both of these facts would also be true if we were considering a set of observers hovering outside the event horizon of a black hole, each observer hovering at a constant radius in Schwarzschild coordinates. In fact, in the close neighborhood of a black hole, the geometry close to the event horizon can be described in Rindler coordinates. Hawking radiation in the case of an accelerating frame is referred to as Unruh radiation. The connection is the equivalence of acceleration with gravitation.

== Geodesics ==
The geodesic equations in the Rindler chart are easily obtained from the geodesic Lagrangian; they are

$$\ddot{t} + \frac{2}{x} \, \dot{x} \, \dot{t} = 0, \; \ddot{x} + x \, \dot{t}^2 = 0, \; \ddot{y} = 0, \; \ddot{z} = 0$$

Of course, in the original Cartesian chart, the geodesics appear as straight lines, so we could easily obtain them in the Rindler chart using our coordinate transformation. However, it is instructive to obtain and study them independently of the original chart, and we shall do so in this section.

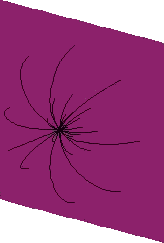
Some representative null geodesics (black hyperbolic semicircular arcs) projected into the spatial hyperslice t = 0 of the Rindler observers. The Rindler horizon is shown as a magenta plane.

From the first, third, and fourth we immediately obtain the first integrals

$$\dot{t} = \frac{E}{x^2}, \; \; \dot{y} = P, \; \; \dot{z} = Q$$

But from the line element we have $\varepsilon = -x^2 \, \dot{t}^2 + \dot{x}^2 + \dot{y}^2 + \dot{z}^2$ where $\varepsilon \in \left\{-1,\, 0,\, 1\right\}$ for timelike, null, and spacelike geodesics, respectively. This gives the fourth first integral, namely

$$\dot{x}^2 = \left(\varepsilon + \frac{E^2}{x^2} \right) - P^2 - Q^2$$.

This suffices to give the complete solution of the geodesic equations.

In the case of null geodesics, from $\frac{E^2}{x^2} \,-\, P^2 \,-\, Q^2$ with nonzero $E$, we see that the x coordinate ranges over the interval

$$0 \,<\, x \,<\, \frac{E}{\sqrt{P^2 \,+\, Q^2}}$$.

The complete seven parameter family giving any null geodesic through any event in the Rindler wedge, is

$$\begin{align}
t - t_0 &= \operatorname{artanh} \left(
\frac{1}{E}\left[s \left(P^2 + Q^2\right) - \sqrt{E^2 - \left(P^2 + Q^2\right) x_0^2}\right]
\right) +\\
& \qquad \operatorname{artanh} \left(
\frac{1}{E}\sqrt{E^2 - (P^2+Q^2) x_0^2}
\right)\\
x &= \sqrt{ x_0^2 + 2s  \sqrt{E^2 - (P^2+Q^2) x_0^2} - s^2 (P^2 + Q^2) }\\
y - y_0 &= Ps;\;\; z - z_0 = Qs
\end{align}$$

Plotting the tracks of some representative null geodesics through a given event (that is, projecting to the hyperslice $t = 0$), we obtain a picture which looks suspiciously like the family of all semicircles through a point and orthogonal to the Rindler horizon (See the figure).

== The Fermat metric ==
The fact that in the Rindler chart, the projections of null geodesics into any spatial hyperslice for the Rindler observers are simply semicircular arcs can be verified directly from the general solution just given, but there is a very simple way to see this. A static spacetime is one in which a vorticity-free timelike Killing vector field can be found. In this case, we have a uniquely defined family of (identical) spatial hyperslices orthogonal to the corresponding static observers (who need not be inertial observers). This allows us to define a new metric on any of these hyperslices which is conformally related to the original metric inherited from the spacetime, but with the property that geodesics in the new metric (note this is a Riemannian metric on a Riemannian three-manifold) are precisely the projections of the null geodesics of spacetime. This new metric is called the Fermat metric, and in a static spacetime endowed with a coordinate chart in which the line element has the form

$$ds^2 = g_{00} \, dt^2 + g_{jk} \, dx^j \, dx^k,\;\; j,\; k \in \{1, 2, 3\}$$

the Fermat metric on $t = 0$ is simply

$$d\rho^2 = \frac{1}{-g_{00}}\left(g_{jk} \, dx^j \, dx^k\right)$$

(where the metric coeffients are understood to be evaluated at $t = 0$).

In the Rindler chart, the timelike translation $\partial_t$ is such a Killing vector field, so this is a static spacetime (not surprisingly, since Minkowski spacetime is of course trivially a static vacuum solution of the Einstein field equation). Therefore, we may immediately write down the Fermat metric for the Rindler observers:

$$d\rho^2 = \frac{1}{x^2}\left(dx^2 + dy^2 + dz^2\right),\;\; \forall x > 0,\;\; \forall y, z$$

But this is the line element of hyperbolic three-space H^{3} in the upper half space chart. This is closely analogous to the upper half plane chart for the hyperbolic plane H^{2}, which is familiar to generations of complex analysis students in connection with conformal mapping problems (and much more), and many mathematically minded readers already know that the geodesics of H^{2} in the upper half plane model are simply semicircles (orthogonal to the circle at infinity represented by the real axis).

== Symmetries ==
Since the Rindler chart is a coordinate chart for Minkowski spacetime, we expect to find ten linearly independent Killing vector fields. Indeed, in the Cartesian chart we can readily find ten linearly independent Killing vector fields, generating respectively one parameter subgroups of time translation, three spatials, three rotations and three boosts. Together these generate the (proper isochronous) Poincaré group, the symmetry group of Minkowski spacetime.

However, it is instructive to write down and solve the Killing vector equations directly. We obtain four familiar looking Killing vector fields

$$\partial_t, \; \; \partial_y, \; \; \partial_z, \; \; -z \, \partial_y + y \, \partial_z$$

(time translation, spatial translations orthogonal to the direction of acceleration, and spatial rotation orthogonal to the direction of acceleration) plus six more:

$$\begin{align}
&\exp(\pm t) \, \left( \frac{y}{x} \, \partial_t \pm \left[ y \, \partial_x - x \, \partial_y \right] \right)\\
&\exp(\pm t) \, \left( \frac{z}{x} \, \partial_t \pm \left[ z \, \partial_x - x \, \partial_z \right] \right)\\
&\exp(\pm t) \, \left( \frac{1}{x} \, \partial_t \pm \partial_x \right)
\end{align}$$

(where the signs are chosen consistently + or −). We leave it as an exercise to figure out how these are related to the standard generators; here we wish to point out that we must be able to obtain generators equivalent to $\partial_T$ in the Cartesian chart, yet the Rindler wedge is obviously not invariant under this translation. How can this be? The answer is that like anything defined by a system of partial differential equations on a smooth manifold, the Killing equation will in general have locally defined solutions, but these might not exist globally. That is, with suitable restrictions on the group parameter, a Killing flow can always be defined in a suitable local neighborhood, but the flow might not be well-defined globally. This has nothing to do with Lorentzian manifolds per se, since the same issue arises in the study of general smooth manifolds.

== Notions of distance ==
One of the many valuable lessons to be learned from a study of the Rindler chart is that there are in fact several distinct (but reasonable) notions of distance which can be used by the Rindler observers.

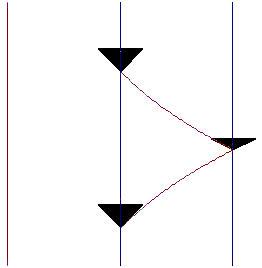
Operational meaning of the radar distance between two Rindler observers (navy blue vertical lines). The Rindler horizon is shown at left (red vertical line). The world line of the radar pulse is also depicted, together with the (properly scaled) light cones at events A, B, C.

The first is the one we have tacitly employed above: the induced Riemannian metric on the spatial hyperslices $t = t_0$. We will call this the ruler distance since it corresponds to this induced Riemannian metric, but its operational meaning might not be immediately apparent.

From the standpoint of physical measurement, a more natural notion of distance between two world lines is the radar distance. This is computed by sending a null geodesic from the world line of our observer (event A) to the world line of some small object, whereupon it is reflected (event B) and returns to the observer (event C). The radar distance is then obtained by dividing the round trip travel time, as measured by an ideal clock carried by our observer.

(In Minkowski spacetime, fortunately, we can ignore the possibility of multiple null geodesic paths between two world lines, but in cosmological models and other applications things are not so simple. We should also caution against assuming that this notion of distance between two observers gives a notion which is symmetric under interchanging the observers.)

In particular, consider a pair of Rindler observers with coordinates $x = x_0, \; y = 0,\; z = 0$ and $x = x_0 + h, \; y = 0,\; z = 0$ respectively. (Note that the first of these, the trailing observer, is accelerating a bit harder, in order to keep up with the leading observer). Setting $dy = dz = 0$ in the Rindler line element, we readily obtain the equation of null geodesics moving in the direction of acceleration:

$$t - t_0 = \log\left(\frac{x}{x_0}\right)$$

Therefore, the radar distance between these two observers is given by

$$x_0 \, \log \left(1 + \frac{h}{x_0} \right) = h - \frac{h^2}{2 \, x_0} + O \left( h^3 \right)$$

This is a bit smaller than the ruler distance, but for nearby observers the discrepancy is negligible.

A third possible notion of distance is this: our observer measures the angle subtended by a unit disk placed on some object (not a point object), as it appears from his location. We call this the optical diameter distance. Because of the simple character of null geodesics in Minkowski spacetime, we can readily determine the optical distance between our pair of Rindler observers (aligned with the direction of acceleration). From a sketch it should be plausible that the optical diameter distance scales like $h + \frac{1}{x_0} + O \left( h^3 \right)$. Therefore, in the case of a trailing observer estimating distance to a leading observer (the case $h > 0$), the optical distance is a bit larger than the ruler distance, which is a bit larger than the radar distance. The reader should now take a moment to consider the case of a leading observer estimating distance to a trailing observer.

There are other notions of distance, but the main point is clear: while the values of these various notions will in general disagree for a given pair of Rindler observers, they all agree that every pair of Rindler observers maintains constant distance. The fact that very nearby Rindler observers are mutually stationary follows from the fact, noted above, that the expansion tensor of the Rindler congruence vanishes identically. However, we have shown here that in various senses, this rigidity property holds at larger scales. This is truly a remarkable rigidity property, given the well-known fact that in relativistic physics, no rod can be accelerated rigidly (and no disk can be spun up rigidly) — at least, not without sustaining inhomogeneous stresses. The easiest way to see this is to observe that in Newtonian physics, if we "kick" a rigid body, all elements of matter in the body will immediately change their state of motion. This is of course incompatible with the relativistic principle that no information having any physical effect can be transmitted faster than the speed of light.

It follows that if a rod is accelerated by some external force applied anywhere along its length, the elements of matter in various different places in the rod cannot all feel the same magnitude of acceleration if the rod is not to extend without bound and ultimately break. In other words, an accelerated rod which does not break must sustain stresses which vary along its length. Furthermore, in any thought experiment with time varying forces, whether we "kick" an object or try to accelerate it gradually, we cannot avoid the problem of avoiding mechanical models which are inconsistent with relativistic kinematics (because distant parts of the body respond too quickly to an applied force).

Returning to the question of the operational significance of the ruler distance, we see that this should be the distance which our observers will obtain should they very slowly pass from hand to hand a small ruler which is repeatedly set end to end. But justifying this interpretation in detail would require some kind of material model.

== Generalization to curved spacetimes ==
Rindler coordinates as described above can be generalized to curved spacetime, as Fermi normal coordinates. The generalization essentially involves constructing an appropriate orthonormal tetrad and then transporting it along the given trajectory using the Fermi–Walker transport rule. For details, see the paper by Ni and Zimmermann in the references below. Such a generalization actually enables one to study inertial and gravitational effects in an Earth-based laboratory, as well as the more interesting coupled inertial-gravitational effects.

== History ==
=== Overview ===
Kottler–Møller and Rindler coordinates

Albert Einstein (1907) studied the effects within a uniformly accelerated frame, obtaining equations for coordinate dependent time dilation and speed of light equivalent to (2c), and in order to make the formulas independent of the observer's origin, he obtained time dilation (2i) in formal agreement with Radar coordinates. While introducing the concept of Born rigidity, Max Born (1909) (Note: Born (1909), p. 25) noted that the formulas for hyperbolic motion can be used as transformations into a "hyperbolically accelerated reference system" (German: hyperbolisch beschleunigtes Bezugsystem) equivalent to (2d). Born's work was further elaborated by Arnold Sommerfeld (1910) (Note: Sommerfeld (1910), pp. 670-671) and Max von Laue (1911) (Note: von Laue, M. (1921). Die Relativitätstheorie, Band 1 (fourth edition of "Das Relativitätsprinzip" ed.). Vieweg.; First edition 1911, second expanded edition 1913, third expanded edition 1919.) who both obtained (2d) using imaginary numbers, which was summarized by Wolfgang Pauli (1921) who besides coordinates (2d) also obtained metric (2e) using imaginary numbers. Einstein (1912) (Note: Einstein (1912), pp. 358-359) studied a static gravitational field and obtained the Kottler–Møller metric (2b) as well as approximations to formulas (2a) using a coordinate dependent speed of light. Hendrik Lorentz (1913) (Note: Lorentz (1913), pp. 34-38; 50-52) obtained coordinates similar to (2d, 2e, 2f) while studying Einstein's equivalence principle and the uniform gravitational field.

A detailed description was given by Friedrich Kottler (1914), (Note: Kottler (1912), pp. 1715; Kottler (1914a), Table I; pp. 747–748; Kottler (1914b), pp. 488–489, 503; Kottler (1916), pp. 958–959; (1918), pp. 453–454;) who formulated the corresponding orthonormal tetrad, transformation formulas and metric (2a, 2b). Also Karl Bollert (1922) (Note: Bollert (1922a), p. 261, 266) obtained the metric (2b) in his study of uniform acceleration and uniform gravitational fields. In a paper concerned with Born rigidity, Georges Lemaître (1924) (Note: Lemaitre (1921), pp. 166, 168) obtained coordinates and metric (2a, 2b). Albert Einstein and Nathan Rosen (1935) described (2d, 2e) as the "well known" expressions for a homogeneous gravitational field. (Note: Einstein & Rosen (1935, p. 74) After Christian Møller (1943) obtained (2a, 2b) in as study related to homogeneous gravitational fields, he (1952) (Note: Møller (1952), pp. 121-123; 255-258) as well as Misner & Thorne & Wheeler (1973) used Fermi–Walker transport to obtain the same equations.

While these investigations were concerned with flat spacetime, Wolfgang Rindler (1960) analyzed hyperbolic motion in curved spacetime, and showed (1966) the analogy between the hyperbolic coordinates (2d, 2e) in flat spacetime with Kruskal coordinates in Schwarzschild space. This influenced subsequent writers in their formulation of Unruh radiation measured by an observer in hyperbolic motion, which is similar to the description of Hawking radiation of black holes.

Horizon

Born (1909) showed that the inner points of a Born rigid body in hyperbolic motion can only be in the region $X/\left(X^{2}-T^{2}\right)>0$. (Note: Born (1909), p. 35) Sommerfeld (1910) defined that the coordinates allowed for the transformation between inertial and hyperbolic coordinates must satisfy $T<X$. (Note: Sommerfeld (1910), p. 672) Kottler (1914) (Note: Kottler (1914), pp. 489-490) defined this region as $X^{2}-T^{2}>0$, and pointed out the existence of a "border plane" (German: Grenzebene) $c^2/\alpha+x$, beyond which no signal can reach the observer in hyperbolic motion. This was called the "horizon of the observer" (German: Horizont des Beobachters) by Bollert (1922). (Note: Bollert (1922b), pp. 194-196) Rindler (1966) demonstrated the relation between such a horizon and the horizon in Kruskal coordinates.

Radar coordinates

Using Bollert's formalism, Stjepan Mohorovičić (1922) (Note: Mohorovičić (1922), p. 92, without $x_1$ in the exponent due to a printing error, which was corrected by Bollert (1922b), p.189, as well as Mohorovičić (1923), p. 54) made a different choice for some parameter and obtained metric (2h) with a printing error, which was corrected by Bollert (1922b) with another printing error, until a version without printing error was given by Mohorovičić (1923). In addition, Mohorovičić erroneously argued that metric (2b, now called Kottler–Møller metric) is incorrect, which was rebutted by Bollert (1922). (Note: Bollert (1922b), p. 189) Metric (2h) was rediscovered by Harry Lass (1963), who also gave the corresponding coordinates (2g) which are sometimes called "Lass coordinates". Metric (2h), as well as (2a, 2b), was also derived by Fritz Rohrlich (1963). Eventually, the Lass coordinates (2g, 2h) were identified with Radar coordinates by Desloge & Philpott (1987).

=== Table with historical formulas ===
Einstein (1907) (Note: Einstein (1907), §§ 18-21) $${\scriptstyle \begin{matrix}\sigma=\tau\left(1+\frac{\gamma\xi}{c^{2}}\right)\\ \sigma=\tau e^{\gamma\xi/c^{2}}\\ c\left(1+\frac{\gamma\xi}{c^{2}}\right) \end{matrix}}$$ Born (1909) $${\scriptstyle \begin{matrix}x=-q\xi,\ y=\eta,\ z=\zeta,\ t=\frac{p}{c^{2}}\xi\\ \left(p=x_{\tau},\ q=-t_{\tau}=\sqrt{1+p^{2}/c^{2}}\right)\\ \boldsymbol{\downarrow}\\ x^{2}-c^{2}t^{2}=\xi^{2} \end{matrix}}$$ Herglotz (1909) $${\scriptstyle \begin{matrix}\begin{align}x & =x'\\ y & =y'\\ t-z & =(t'-z')e^{\vartheta}\\ t+z & =(t'+z')e^{-\vartheta} \end{align} \\ \boldsymbol{\downarrow}\\ x=x_{0},\quad y=y_{0},\quad z=\sqrt{z_{0}^{2}+t^{2}} \end{matrix}}$$ Sommerfeld (1910) $$\scriptstyle\begin{align} x & =r\cos\varphi\\ y & =y'\\ z & =z'\\ l & =r\sin\varphi\\ \varphi & =i\psi,\ l =ict \end{align}$$ von Laue (1911) (Note: von Laue (1911), p. 109) $$\scriptstyle\begin{align} X & =R\cos\varphi\\ L & =R\sin\varphi\\ R^{2} & =X^{2}+L^{2}\\ \tan\varphi & =\frac{L}{X} \end{align}$$ Einstein (1912) $${\scriptstyle \begin{matrix}d\xi^{2}-d\tau^{2}=dx^{2}-c^{2}dt^{2}\\ \boldsymbol{\downarrow}\\ c=c_{0}+ax\\ \boldsymbol{\downarrow}\\ \begin{align}\xi & =x+\frac{ac}{2}t^{2}\\ \eta & =y\\ \zeta & =z\\ \tau & =ct \end{align} \end{matrix}}$$ Kottler (1912) (Note: Kottler (1912), pp. 1715) $${\scriptstyle \begin{align}x^{(1)} & =x_{0}^{(1)}\\ x^{(2)} & =x_{0}^{(2)}\\ x^{(3)} & =b\cos i\varphi\\ x^{(4)} & =b\sin i\varphi \end{align}}$$ Lorentz (1913) $${\scriptstyle \begin{matrix}dc=\frac{g}{c}dz\\ \hline \begin{align}z & =a\left(z'-z_{0}^{\prime}\right)\\ ct & =b\left(z'-z_{0}^{\prime}\right)\\ a & =\frac{1}{2}\left(e^{kt'}+e^{-kt}\right)\\ b & =\frac{1}{2}\left(e^{kt'}-e^{-kt}\right) \end{align} \\ \boldsymbol{\downarrow}\\ c'=k\left(z'-z_{0}^{\prime}\right),\ z'-z_{0}^{\prime}=\frac{c^{2}}{g}\\ \boldsymbol{\downarrow}\\ \begin{align} & dx^{2}+dy^{2}+dz^{2}-c^{2}dt\\ & =dx^{\prime2}+dy^{\prime2}+dz^{\prime2}-c^{\prime2}dt^{\prime2} \end{align} \end{matrix}}$$	Kottler (1914a) (Note: Kottler (1914a), Table I; pp. 747-748) $${\scriptstyle \begin{matrix}\begin{align}x^{(1)} & =x_{0}^{(1)}\\ x^{(2)} & =x_{0}^{(2)}\\ x^{(3)} & =b\cos iu\\ x^{(4)} & =b\sin iu \end{align} \\ \boldsymbol{\downarrow}\\ ds^{2}=-c^{2}d\tau^{2}=b^{2}(du)^{2}\\ \boldsymbol{\downarrow}\\ \begin{matrix}c_{1}^{(1)}=0, &  & c_{1}^{(2)}=0, &  & c_{1}^{(3)}=-\sin iu, &  & c_{1}^{(4)}=\cos iu,\\ c_{2}^{(1)}=0, &  & c_{2}^{(2)}=0, &  & c_{2}^{(3)}=-\cos iu, &  & c_{2}^{(4)}=-\sin iu, \end{matrix}\\ \boldsymbol{\downarrow}\\ dS^{2}=(dX')^{2}+(dY')^{2}+(dZ')^{2}-\left(c+\frac{Z'c}{b}\right)^{2}dT'\\ \boldsymbol{\downarrow}\\ c'=c+\frac{Z'c^{2}}{b}\cdot\frac{1}{c} \end{matrix}}$$ Kottler (1914b) (Note: Kottler (1914b), pp. 488-489, 503) $$\scriptstyle\begin{matrix}\begin{matrix} c_{1}^{(1)}=0, &  & c_{1}^{(2)}=0, &  & c_{1}^{(3)}=\frac{1}{i}\sinh u, &  & c_{1}^{(4)}=\cosh u,\\ c_{2}^{(1)}=0, &  & c_{2}^{(2)}=0, &  & c_{2}^{(3)}=\frac{1}{i}\cosh u, &  & c_{2}^{(4)}=-\sinh u,\\ c_{3}^{(1)}=1, &  & c_{3}^{(2)}=0, &  & c_{3}^{(3)}=0, &  & c_{3}^{(4)}=0,\\ c_{4}^{(1)}=0, &  & c_{4}^{(2)}=1, &  & c_{4}^{(3)}=0, &  & c_{4}^{(4)}=0, \end{matrix}\\ \boldsymbol{\downarrow}\\ X=x+\Delta^{(2)}c_{2}+\Delta^{(3)}c_{3}+\Delta^{(4)}c_{4}\\ \boldsymbol{\downarrow}\\ \begin{align} X & =x_{0}+\mathfrak{X}'\\ Y & =y_{0}+\mathfrak{Y}'\\ Z & =\left(b+\mathfrak{Z}'\right)\cosh\mathfrak{u}\\ cT & =\left(b+\mathfrak{Z}'\right)\sinh\mathfrak{u} \end{align}\\ \left(\Delta^{(2)}=\mathfrak{X}',\ \Delta^{(3)}=\mathfrak{Y}',\ \Delta^{(4)}=\mathfrak{Z}'\right)\\ \boldsymbol{\downarrow}\\ \begin{align} \mathfrak{X}' & =X_{0}-x_{0}+q_{x}T\\ \mathfrak{Y}' & =Y_{0}-y_{0}+q_{y}T\\ b+\mathfrak{Z}' & =\sqrt{\left(Z_{0}+q_{x}T\right)^{2}-c^{2}T^{2}}\\ c\mathfrak{T}' & =b\operatorname{artanh}\frac{cT}{Z_{0}+q_{x}T} \end{align}\\ \left(X=X_{0}+q_{x}T,\ Y=Y_{0}+q_{y}T,\ Z=Z_{0}+q_{x}T\right)\\ \boldsymbol{\downarrow}\\ dS^{2}=(d\mathfrak{X}')^{2}+(d\mathfrak{Y}')^{2}+(d\mathfrak{Z}')^{2}-c^{2}\left(\frac{b+\mathfrak{Z}'}{b^{2}}\right)^{2}(d\mathfrak{T}')^{2} \end{matrix}$$ Kottler (1916, 1918) (Note: Kottler (1916), pp. 958-959; (1918), pp. 453-454) $$\scriptstyle\begin{matrix}\begin{align} x & =x'\\ y & =y'\\ \frac{c^{2}}{\gamma}+z & =\left(\frac{c^{2}}{\gamma}+z'\right)\cosh\frac{\gamma t'}{c}\\ ct & =\left(\frac{c^{2}}{\gamma}+z'\right)\sinh\frac{\gamma t'}{c} \end{align}\\ \boldsymbol{\downarrow}\\ ds^{2}=dx^{\prime2}+dy^{\prime2}+dz^{\prime2}-\left(c+\frac{\gamma}{c}z'\right){}^{2}dt^{\prime2} \end{matrix}$$	Pauli (1921) (Note: Pauli (1921), pp. 647-648) $$\scriptstyle\begin{matrix}\begin{align} x^{1} & =\varrho\cos\varphi\\ x^{4} & =\varrho\sin\varphi \end{align}\\ \boldsymbol{\downarrow}\\ ds^{2}=\left(d\xi^{1}\right)^{2}+\left(d\xi^{2}\right)^{2}+\left(d\xi^{3}\right)^{2}+\left(\xi^{1}\right)^{2}\left(d\xi^{4}\right)^{2}\\ \left(\xi^{(1)}=\varrho,\ \xi^{(2)}=x^{(2)},\ \xi^{(3)}=x^{(3)},\ \xi^{(4)}=\varphi\right) \end{matrix}$$ Bollert (1922) $${\scriptstyle \begin{matrix}ds^{2}=c^{2}\left(1+\frac{\gamma_{0}x}{c^{2}}\right)d\tau^{2}-dx^{2}-dy^{2}-dz^{2}\\ \hline ds^{2}=g_{44}dx_{4}^{2}+g_{11}dx_{1}^{2}+g_{22}\left(dx_{2}^{2}+dx_{3}^{2}\right)\\ \boldsymbol{\downarrow}\\ V''-\frac{g_{11}}{2g_{11}}V'=0\\ \left(g_{22}=-1,\ g_{11}=-1,\ V''=0,\ V=ax+b\right)\\ \boldsymbol{\downarrow}\\ ds^{2}=dx_{4}^{2}(ax+b)^{2}-dx^{2}-dy^{2}-dz^{2} \end{matrix}}$$ Mohorovičić (1922, 1923); Bollert (1922b) $${\scriptstyle \begin{matrix}\text{Mohorovičić (1922):}\\ g_{11}=g_{44}=V^{2},\ VV''-V'^{2}=0,\ V\left(x_{1}\right)=e^{ax_{1}}\\ \boldsymbol{\downarrow}\\ ds^{2}=e^{2a}\left(-dx_{4}^{2}+dx_{1}^{2}\right)+dx_{2}^{2}+dx_{3}^{2}\\ \\ \text{corrected by Bollert (1922b):}\\ ds^{2}=e^{2ax}\left(-dx_{4}^{2}+dx_{1}^{2}\right)+dx_{2}^{2}+dx_{3}^{2}\\ \\ \text{final correction by Mohorovičić (1923):}\\ ds^{2}=e^{2ax_{1}}\left(-dx_{4}^{2}+dx_{1}^{2}\right)+dx_{2}^{2}+dx_{3}^{2} \end{matrix}}$$ Lemaître (1924) $${\scriptstyle \begin{matrix}\begin{align}1+g\xi= & (1+gx)\cosh gt\\ g\tau= & (1+gx)\sinh gt \end{align} \\ \boldsymbol{\downarrow}\\ ds^{2}=-dx^{2}-dy^{2}-dz^{2}+(1+gx)^{2}dt^{2} \end{matrix}}$$ Einstein & Rosen (1935) $$\scriptstyle\begin{matrix}\begin{align} \xi_{1} & =x_{1}\cosh\alpha x_{4}\\ \xi_{2} & =x_{2}\\ \xi_{3} & =x_{3}\\ \xi_{4} & =x_{1}\sinh\alpha x_{4} \end{align}\\ \boldsymbol{\downarrow}\\ ds^{2}=-dx_{1}^{2}-dx_{2}^{2}-dx_{3}^{2}+\alpha{}^{2}x_{1}^{2}dx_{4}^{2} \end{matrix}$$ Møller (1952) $$\scriptstyle\begin{matrix}\alpha_{ik}=\left(\begin{matrix}U_{4}/ic & 0 & 0 & iU_{1}/c\\ 0 & 1 & 0 & 0\\ 0 & 0 & 1 & 0\\ U_{1}/ic & 0 & 0 & U_{4}/ic \end{matrix}\right)\\ U_{i}=\left(c\sinh\frac{g\tau}{c},\ 0,0,\ ig\cosh\frac{g\tau}{c}\right)\\ \boldsymbol{\downarrow}\\ X_{i}=\mathbf{f}_{i}(t)+x^{\prime\kappa}\alpha_{\kappa i}(\tau)\\ \boldsymbol{\downarrow}\\ \begin{align} X & =\frac{c^{2}}{g}\left(\cosh\frac{gt}{c}-1\right)+x\cosh\frac{gt}{c}\\ Y & =y\\ Z & =z\\ T & =\frac{c}{g}\sinh\frac{gt}{c}+x\frac{\sinh\frac{gt}{c}}{c} \end{align}\\ \boldsymbol{\downarrow}\\ ds^{2}=dx^{2}+dy^{2}+dz^{2}-c^{2}dt^{2}\left(1+gx/c^{2}\right)^{2}\\ \\ \end{matrix}$$

== See also ==
- Bell's spaceship paradox, for a sometimes controversial subject often studied using Rindler coordinates.
- Born coordinates, for another important coordinate system adapted to the motion of certain accelerated observers in Minkowski spacetime.
- Congruence (general relativity)
- Ehrenfest paradox, for a sometimes controversial subject often studied using Born coordinates.
- Frame fields in general relativity
- General relativity resources
- Milne model
- Raychaudhuri equation
- Unruh effect
