= Unruh effect =

Kinematic prediction of quantum field theory for an accelerating observer

The Unruh effect (also known as the Fulling–Davies–Unruh effect) is a hypothetical, observer-dependent prediction of quantum field theory that an observer who is uniformly accelerating through empty space (Minkowski vacuum) will perceive a thermal bath. This means that even in the absence of any external heat sources, an accelerating observer will detect particles and experience a temperature. In contrast, an inertial observer in the same region of spacetime would observe no particles and no temperature.

In other words, the background appears to be warm from an accelerating reference frame. In layman's terms, an accelerating thermometer in empty space (like one being waved around), without any other contribution to its temperature, will record a non-zero temperature, just from its acceleration. Heuristically, for a uniformly accelerating observer, the ground state of an inertial observer is seen as a mixed state in thermodynamic equilibrium with a non-zero temperature bath.

The Unruh effect was first described by Stephen Fulling in 1973, Paul Davies in 1975 and W. G. Unruh in 1976. It is currently not clear whether the Unruh effect has actually been observed, since the claimed observations are disputed. There is also some doubt about whether the Unruh effect implies the existence of Unruh radiation.

== Temperature equation ==
The Unruh temperature, sometimes called the Davies–Unruh temperature, was derived separately by Paul Davies and William Unruh and is the effective temperature experienced by a uniformly accelerating detector in a vacuum field. It is given by

$$T = \frac{\hbar a}{2\pi c k_\mathrm{B}}\approx 4.06\times 10^{-21}\,\mathrm{K{\cdot}s^2{\cdot}m^{-1}}\times a,$$

where ħ is the reduced Planck constant, a is the proper uniform acceleration, c is the speed of light, and k_{B} is the Boltzmann constant. Thus, for example, a proper acceleration of 2.47×10^{20} m⋅s^{−2} corresponds approximately to a temperature of 1 K. Conversely, an acceleration of 1 m⋅s^{−2} corresponds to a temperature of 4.06×10^{−21} K.

The Unruh temperature has the same form as the Hawking temperature T_{H} = ħg/2πck_{B} with g denoting the surface gravity of a black hole, which was derived by Stephen Hawking in 1974. In the light of the equivalence principle, it is, therefore, sometimes called the Hawking–Unruh temperature.

Solving the Unruh temperature for the uniform acceleration, it can be expressed as

$$a = \frac{2\pi c k_\mathrm{B}}{\hbar}T = 2\pi a_\mathrm{P} \frac{T}{T_\mathrm{P}}$$,

where $a_\mathrm{P}$ is Planck acceleration and $T_\mathrm{P}$ is Planck temperature.

== Explanation ==
Unruh demonstrated theoretically that the notion of vacuum depends on the path of the observer through spacetime. From the viewpoint of the accelerating observer, the vacuum of the inertial observer will look like a state containing many particles in thermal equilibrium—a warm gas.

The Unruh effect would only appear to an accelerating observer. And although the Unruh effect would initially be perceived as counter-intuitive, it makes sense if the word vacuum is interpreted in the following specific way. In quantum field theory, the concept of "vacuum" is not the same as "empty space": Space is filled with the quantized fields that make up the universe. Vacuum is simply the lowest possible energy state of these fields.

The energy states of any quantized field are defined by the Hamiltonian, based on local conditions, including the time coordinate. According to special relativity, two observers moving relative to each other must use different time coordinates. If those observers are accelerating, there may be no shared coordinate system. Hence, the observers will see different quantum states and thus different vacua.

In some cases, the vacuum of one observer is not even in the space of quantum states of the other. In technical terms, this comes about because the two vacua lead to unitarily inequivalent representations of the quantum field canonical commutation relations. This is because two mutually accelerating observers may not be able to find a globally defined coordinate transformation relating their coordinate choices.

An accelerating observer will perceive an apparent event horizon forming (see Rindler spacetime). The existence of Unruh radiation could be linked to this apparent event horizon, putting it in the same conceptual framework as Hawking radiation. On the other hand, the theory of the Unruh effect explains that the definition of what constitutes a "particle" depends on the state of motion of the observer.

The free field needs to be decomposed into positive and negative frequency components before defining the creation and annihilation operators. This can only be done in spacetimes with a timelike Killing vector field. This decomposition happens to be different in Cartesian and Rindler coordinates (although the two are related by a Bogoliubov transformation). This explains why the "particle numbers", which are defined in terms of the creation and annihilation operators, are different in both coordinates.

The Rindler spacetime has a horizon, and locally any non-extremal black hole horizon is Rindler. So the Rindler spacetime gives the local properties of black holes and cosmological horizons. It is possible to rearrange the metric restricted to these regions to obtain the Rindler metric. The Unruh effect would then be the near-horizon form of Hawking radiation.

The Unruh effect is also expected to be present in de Sitter space.

It is worth stressing that the Unruh effect only says that, according to uniformly-accelerated observers, the vacuum state is a thermal state specified by its temperature, and one should resist reading too much into the thermal state or bath. Different thermal states or baths at the same temperature need not be equal, for they depend on the Hamiltonian describing the system. In particular, the thermal bath seen by accelerated observers in the vacuum state of a quantum field is not the same as a thermal state of the same field at the same temperature according to inertial observers. Furthermore, uniformly accelerated observers, static with respect to each other, can have different proper accelerations a (depending on their separation), which is a direct consequence of relativistic red-shift effects. This makes the Unruh temperature spatially inhomogeneous across the uniformly accelerated frame.

== Calculations ==
In special relativity, an observer moving with uniform proper acceleration a through Minkowski spacetime is conveniently described with Rindler coordinates, which are related to the standard (Cartesian) Minkowski coordinates by

$$\begin{align}
x &= \rho \cosh(\sigma) \\
t &= \rho \sinh(\sigma).
\end{align}$$

The line element in Rindler coordinates, i.e. Rindler space is

$$\mathrm{d}s^2 = -\rho^2\, \mathrm{d}\sigma^2 + \mathrm{d}\rho^2,$$

where ρ = 1/a, and σ = aτ/c, where τ is the proper time.

An observer moving with fixed ρ traces out a hyperbola in Minkowski space, therefore this type of motion is called hyperbolic motion. The coordinate $\rho$ is related to the Schwarzschild spherical coordinate $r_S$ by the relation

$$\rho = \int^r_{r_S}\frac{dr^\prime}{\sqrt{1-r_S/r^\prime}}.$$

An observer moving along a path of constant ρ is uniformly accelerating, and is coupled to field modes which have a definite steady frequency as a function of σ. These modes are constantly Doppler shifted relative to ordinary Minkowski time as the detector accelerates, and they change in frequency by enormous factors, even after only a short proper time.

Translation in σ is a symmetry of Minkowski space: it can be shown that it corresponds to a boost in x, t coordinate around the origin. Any time translation in quantum mechanics is generated by the Hamiltonian operator. For a detector coupled to modes with a definite frequency in σ, we can treat σ as "time" and the boost operator is then the corresponding Hamiltonian. In Euclidean field theory, where the minus sign in front of the time in the Rindler metric is changed to a plus sign by multiplying $i$ to the Rindler time, i.e. a Wick rotation or imaginary time, the Rindler metric is turned into a polar-coordinate-like metric. Therefore any rotations must close themselves after 2π in a Euclidean metric to avoid being singular. So

$$e^{2\pi i H} = Id.$$

A path integral with real time coordinate is dual to a thermal partition function, related by a Wick rotation. The periodicity $\beta$ of imaginary time corresponds to a temperature of $\beta = 1/T$ in thermal quantum field theory. Note that the path integral for this Hamiltonian is closed with period 2π. This means that the H modes are thermally occupied with temperature 1/2π. This is not an actual temperature, because H is dimensionless. It is conjugate to the timelike polar angle σ, which is also dimensionless. To restore the length dimension, note that a mode of fixed frequency f in σ at position ρ has a frequency which is determined by the square root of the (absolute value of the) metric at ρ, the redshift factor. This can be seen by transforming the time coordinate of a Rindler observer at fixed ρ to an inertial, co-moving observer observing a proper time. From the Rindler-line-element given above, this is just ρ. The actual inverse temperature at this point is therefore

$$\beta = 2\pi \rho.$$

It can be shown that the acceleration of a trajectory at constant ρ in Rindler coordinates is equal to 1/ρ, so the actual inverse temperature observed is

$$\beta = \frac{2\pi}{a}.$$

Restoring units yields

$$k_\text{B}T = \frac{\hbar a}{2\pi c}.$$

The temperature of the vacuum, seen by an isolated observer accelerating at the Earth's gravitational acceleration of g = 9.81 m·s^{−2}, is only 4×10^{−20} K. For an experimental test of the Unruh effect it is planned to use accelerations up to 10^{26} m·s^{−2}, which would give a temperature of about 400000 K.

The Rindler derivation of the Unruh effect is unsatisfactory to some, since the detector's path is super-deterministic. Unruh later developed the Unruh–DeWitt particle detector model to circumvent this objection.

== Other implications ==
The Unruh effect would also cause the decay rate of accelerating particles to differ from inertial particles. Stable particles like the electron could have nonzero transition rates to higher mass states when accelerating at a high enough rate.

== Unruh radiation ==
Although Unruh's prediction that an accelerating detector would see a thermal bath is not controversial, the interpretation of the transitions in the detector in the non-accelerating frame is.

It is widely, although not universally, believed that each transition in the detector is accompanied by the emission of a particle, and that this particle will propagate to infinity and be seen as Unruh radiation. Smolyaninov claims that it has already been observed, while O'Connell and Ford claim that it is not emitted at all. While these skeptics accept that an accelerating object thermalizes at the Unruh temperature, they do not believe that this leads to the emission of photons, arguing that the emission and absorption rates of the accelerating particle are balanced.

== Experimental observation ==
Researchers claim experiments that successfully detected the Sokolov–Ternov effect may also detect the Unruh effect under certain conditions.

Theoretical work in 2011 suggests that accelerating detectors could be used for the direct detection of the Unruh effect with current technology.

The Unruh effect may have been observed for the first time in 2019 in the high energy channeling radiation explored by the NA63 experiment at CERN.

== See also ==
- Dynamical Casimir effect
- Cosmic Background Radiation
- Hawking radiation
- Black hole thermodynamics
- Pair production
- Quantum information
- Superradiance
- Virtual particle
