= Stephen A. Fulling =

American mathematician

Stephen Albert Fulling
- Born: 29 April 1945; Evansville, Indiana
- Education: Harvard University; Princeton University
- Known for: Fulling–Davies–Unruh effect
- Scientific career
- Fields: Mathematics, Physics
- Workplaces: University of Wisconsin-Milwaukee; King's College London; Texas A&M University
- Thesis: Scalar Quantum Field Theory in a Closed Universe of Constant Curvature (1972)
- Academic advisors: Arthur Wightman

Stephen Albert Fulling (born 29 April 1945, Evansville, Indiana) is an American mathematician and mathematical physicist, specializing in the mathematics of quantum theory, general relativity, and the spectral and asymptotic theory of differential operators. He is known for preliminary work that led to the discovery of the hypothetical Unruh effect (also known as the Fulling-Davies-Unruh effect).

== Education and career ==
After secondary education at Missouri's Lindbergh High School, Fulling graduated in 1967 with A.B. in physics from Harvard University. At Princeton University he became a graduate student in physics and received M.S. in 1969 and Ph.D. in 1972. His thesis Scalar Quantum Field Theory in a Closed Universe of Constant Curvature was supervised by Arthur Wightman. Fulling was a postdoc from 1972 to 1974 at the University of Wisconsin-Milwaukee and from 1974 to 1976 at King's College London. At Texas A&M University he joined the mathematics faculty in 1976 and was promoted to full professor in 1984. In addition to mathematics, he holds a joint appointment in physics and astronomy.

In addition to more than a hundred papers and publications, he has authored two books, Aspects of Quantum Field Theory in Curved Space-Time (Cambridge University Press, 1989) and Linearity and the Mathematics of Several Variables (World Scientific, 2000).

In 2018 Fulling was elected a fellow of the American Physical Society. He has also been elected a foreign member of the Royal Society of Sciences in Uppsala.

== Selected publications ==
=== Books ===
- Fulling, Stephen A. (1989-08-24). Aspects of Quantum Field Theory in Curved Spacetime. Cambridge University Press. ISBN 9780521377683.
- Fulling, Stephen A.; Sinyakov, Michael N.; Tischchenko, Sergei V. (2000). Linearity and the Mathematics of Several Variables. World Scientific. ISBN 978-981-02-4196-4.

=== Articles ===
- Fulling, Stephen A. (1973). "Nonuniqueness of Canonical Field Quantization in Riemannian Space-Time". Physical Review D. 7 (10): 2850–2862. Bibcode:1973PhRvD...7.2850F. doi:10.1103/PhysRevD.7.2850.
- Fulling, S. A.; Davies, P. C. W. (1976). "Radiation from a Moving Mirror in Two Dimensional Space-Time: Conformal Anomaly". Proceedings of the Royal Society A: Mathematical, Physical and Engineering Sciences. 348 (1654): 393–414. Bibcode:1976RSPSA.348..393F. doi:10.1098/rspa.1976.0045. S2CID 122176090.
- Christensen, S. M.; Fulling, S. A. (1977). "Trace anomalies and the Hawking effect". Physical Review D. 15 (8): 2088–2104. Bibcode:1977PhRvD..15.2088C. doi:10.1103/PhysRevD.15.2088.
- Parker, Leonard; Fulling, S. A. (1974). "Adiabatic regularization of the energy-momentum tensor of a quantized field in homogeneous spaces". Physical Review D. 9 (2): 341–354. Bibcode:1974PhRvD...9..341P. doi:10.1103/PhysRevD.9.341.
- Davies, P. C. W.; Fulling, S. A.; Unruh, W. G. (1976). "Energy-momentum tensor near an evaporating black hole". Physical Review D. 13 (10): 2720–2723. Bibcode:1976PhRvD..13.2720D. doi:10.1103/PhysRevD.13.2720. S2CID 124632555.
- Parker, Leonard; Fulling, S. A. (1973). "Quantized Matter Fields and the Avoidance of Singularities in General Relativity". Physical Review D. 7 (8): 2357–2374. Bibcode:1973PhRvD...7.2357P. doi:10.1103/PhysRevD.7.2357.
- Fulling, S. A.; Parker, Leonard; Hu, B. L. (1974). "Conformal energy-momentum tensor in curved spacetime: Adiabatic regularization and renormalization". Physical Review D. 10 (12): 3905–3924. Bibcode:1974PhRvD..10.3905F. doi:10.1103/PhysRevD.10.3905.

== See also ==
- Differential operator
- Fulling–Davies–Unruh effect
- General relativity
- Mathematical formulation of quantum mechanics
- Quantum Field Theory
