= Karl Bollert =

German pedagogue and physicist

Karl Bollert (21 June 1881 in Rostock – 1964) was a German pedagogue and physicist.

== Life and work ==
He studied in Rostock and obtained the doctorate in 1904 by writing a thesis on geometry called Über konzentrische Flächen zweiter Ordnung. In 1907 he became senior teacher at the Höhere Mädchenschule in Berlin-Schöneberg. (Note: Programm Berlin Joachimsthalsches Gymnasium 1907, in: Franz Kössler: Personenlexikon von Lehrer des 19. Jahrhunderts, Gießen 2008, doi:10.22029/jlupub-17233) He was a member of the Deutsche Physikalische Gesellschaft from 1923 to 1933. (Note: List of members of Deutsche Physikalische Gesellschaft 1845-1945)

From 1921 to 1923 he wrote several works related to the theory of relativity, including the description of uniformly accelerated frames now called Rindler coordinates, and philosophically interpreted relativity in terms of neo-Kantianism in his book Einstein’s Relativitätstheorie und ihre Stellung im System der Gesamterfahrung (1921) as well as in another article. Reviewing Bollert's book, Hans Reichenbach (1922) argued that its description of relativity is "short and good", and regarding the philosophical part he added that Bollert's introduction of "objectivation steps" is remarkable. Ernst Cassirer (1929) argued that Bollert showed how relativity can serve to confirm Neokantian views.

An analysis of Bollert's philosophical take on relativity was given in German language by Hentschel (1990). (Note: See p. 232f in Hentschel, K. (1990). Interpretationen und Fehlinterpretationen der speziellen und der allgemeinen Relativitätstheorie durch Zeitgenossen Albert Einsteins. Basel—Boston—Bonn: Birkhäuser. doi:10.18419/opus-7182. ISBN 978-3-7643-2438-4.) In English language, the article "Early Philosophical Interpretations of General Relativity" in the Stanford Encyclopedia of Philosophy devotes an entire paragraph to Bollert's interpretation of Kantian a priorism and relativity theory.
