= Ehrenfest paradox =

Paradox in special relativity

The Ehrenfest paradox concerns the rotation of a "rigid" disc in the theory of relativity.

In its original 1909 formulation as presented by Paul Ehrenfest in relation to the concept of Born rigidity within special relativity, it discusses an ideally rigid cylinder that is made to rotate about its axis of symmetry. The radius R as seen in the laboratory frame is always perpendicular to its motion and should therefore be equal to its value R_{0} when stationary. However, the circumference (2πR) should appear Lorentz-contracted to a smaller value than at rest, by the usual factor γ. This leads to the contradiction that R = R_{0} and R < R_{0}.

The paradox has been deepened further by Albert Einstein, who showed that since measuring rods aligned along the periphery and moving with it should appear contracted, more would fit around the circumference, which would thus measure greater than 2πR. This indicates that geometry is non-Euclidean for rotating observers, and was important for Einstein's development of general relativity.

Any rigid object made from real material that is rotating with a transverse velocity close to that material's speed of sound must exceed the point of rupture due to centrifugal force, because centrifugal pressure can not exceed the shear modulus of material.

$$\frac{F}{S} = \frac{mv^2}{rS} < \frac{mc_s^2}{rS} \approx \frac{mG}{rS \rho} \approx G$$

where $c_s$ is speed of sound, $\rho$ is density and $G$ is shear modulus. Therefore, when considering relativistic speeds, it is only a thought experiment. Neutron-degenerate matter may allow velocities close to the speed of light, since the speed of a neutron-star oscillation is relativistic (though these bodies cannot strictly be said to be "rigid").

== Essence of the paradox ==
Imagine a disk of radius R rotating with constant angular velocity $\omega$.

Ehrenfest paradox – Circumference of a rotating disk should contract but not the radius, as radius is perpendicular to the direction of motion.

The reference frame is fixed to the stationary center of the disk. Then the magnitude of the relative velocity of any point in the circumference of the disk is $\omega R$. So the circumference will undergo Lorentz contraction by a factor of $\sqrt{1-(\omega R)^2/c^2}$.

However, since the radius is perpendicular to the direction of motion, it will not undergo any contraction. So

$$\frac{\mathrm{circumference}}{\mathrm{diameter}}=\frac{2\pi R \sqrt{1-(\omega R)^2/c^2}}{2R} = \pi \sqrt{1-(\omega R)^2/c^2}.$$

This is paradoxical, since in accordance with Euclidean geometry, it should be exactly equal to π.

== Ehrenfest's argument ==
Ehrenfest considered an ideal Born-rigid cylinder that is made to rotate. Assuming that the cylinder does not expand or contract, its radius stays the same. But measuring rods laid out along the circumference $2 \pi R$ should be Lorentz-contracted to a smaller value than at rest, by the usual factor γ. This leads to the paradox that the rigid measuring rods would have to separate from one another due to Lorentz contraction; the discrepancy noted by Ehrenfest seems to suggest that a rotated Born rigid disk should shatter.

Thus Ehrenfest argued by reductio ad absurdum that Born rigidity is not generally compatible with special relativity. According to special relativity an object cannot be spun up from a non-rotating state while maintaining Born rigidity, but once it has achieved a constant nonzero angular velocity it does maintain Born rigidity without violating special relativity, and then (as Einstein later showed) a disk-riding observer will measure a circumference: $C^\prime = \frac{2\pi R}{\sqrt{1-v^2/c^2}}.$

== Einstein and general relativity ==
The rotating disc and its connection with rigidity was also an important thought experiment for Albert Einstein in developing general relativity. He referred to it in several publications in 1912, 1916, 1917, 1922 and drew the insight from it, that the geometry of the disc becomes non-Euclidean for a co-rotating observer. Einstein wrote (1922):

66ff: Imagine a circle drawn about the origin in the x'y' plane of K' and a diameter of this circle. Imagine, further, that we have given a large number of rigid rods, all equal to each other. We suppose these laid in series along the periphery and the diameter of the circle, at rest relatively to K'. If U is the number of these rods along the periphery, D the number along the diameter, then, if K' does not rotate relatively to K, we shall have $U/D=\pi$. But if K' rotates we get a different result. Suppose that at a definite time t of K we determine the ends of all the rods. With respect to K all the rods upon the periphery experience the Lorentz contraction, but the rods upon the diameter do not experience this contraction (along their lengths!). It therefore follows that $U/D>\pi$.

It therefore follows that the laws of configuration of rigid bodies with respect to K' do not agree with the laws of configuration of rigid bodies that are in accordance with Euclidean geometry. If, further, we place two similar clocks (rotating with K'), one upon the periphery, and the other at the centre of the circle, then, judged from K, the clock on the periphery will go slower than the clock at the centre. The same thing must take place, judged from K' if we define time with respect to K' in a not wholly unnatural way, that is, in such a way that the laws with respect to K' depend explicitly upon the time. Space and time, therefore, cannot be defined with respect to K' as they were in the special theory of relativity with respect to inertial systems. But, according to the principle of equivalence, K' is also to be considered as a system at rest, with respect to which there is a gravitational field (field of centrifugal force, and force of Coriolis). We therefore arrive at the result: the gravitational field influences and even determines the metrical laws of the space-time continuum. If the laws of configuration of ideal rigid bodies are to be expressed geometrically, then in the presence of a gravitational field the geometry is not Euclidean.

== Brief history ==
Citations to the papers mentioned below (and many which are not) can be found in a paper by Øyvind Grøn which is available on-line.

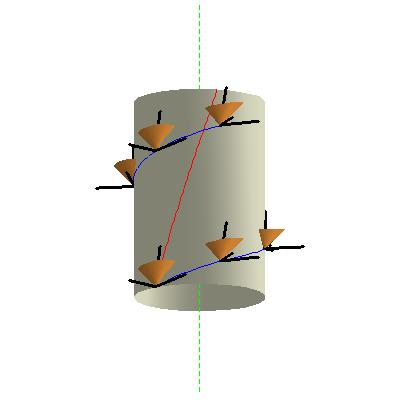
This figure shows the world line of a Langevin observer (red helical curve). The figure also depicts the light cones at several events with the frame field of the Langevin observer passing through that event.

- 1909: Max Born introduces a notion of rigid motion in special relativity.
- 1909: After studying Born's notion of rigidity, Paul Ehrenfest demonstrated by means of a paradox about a cylinder that goes from rest to rotation, that most motions of extended bodies cannot be Born rigid.
- 1910: Gustav Herglotz and Fritz Noether independently elaborated on Born's model and showed (Herglotz–Noether theorem) that Born rigidity only allows three degrees of freedom for bodies in motion. For instance, it's possible that a rigid body is executing uniform rotation, yet accelerated rotation is impossible. So a Born rigid body cannot be brought from a state of rest into rotation, confirming Ehrenfest's result.
- 1910: Max Planck calls attention to the fact that one should not confuse the problem of the contraction of a disc due to spinning it up, with that of what disk-riding observers will measure as compared to stationary observers. He suggests that resolving the first problem will require introducing some material model and employing the theory of elasticity.
- 1910: Theodor Kaluza points out that there is nothing inherently paradoxical about the static and disk-riding observers obtaining different results for the circumference. This does however imply, Kaluza argues, that "the geometry of the rotating disk" is non-euclidean. He asserts without proof that this geometry is in fact essentially just the geometry of the hyperbolic plane.
- 1911: Vladimir Varićak argued that the paradox only occurs in the Lorentz standpoint, where rigid bodies contract, but not if the contraction is "caused by the manner of our clock-regulation and length-measurement". Einstein published a rebuttal, denying that his viewpoint was different from Lorentz's.
- 1911: Max von Laue shows, that an accelerated body has an infinite number of degrees of freedom, thus no rigid bodies can exist in special relativity.
- 1916: While writing up his new general theory of relativity, Albert Einstein notices that disk-riding observers measure a longer circumference, C′ = 2πr/√1−v^{2}. That is, because rulers moving parallel to their length axis appear shorter as measured by static observers, the disk-riding observers can fit more smaller rulers of a given length around the circumference than stationary observers could.
- 1922: A. S. Eddington, in The Mathematical Theory of Relativity (p. 113), calculates a contraction of the radius of the rotating disc (compared to stationary scales) of one quarter of the 'Lorentz contraction' factor applied to the circumference.
- 1935: Paul Langevin essentially introduces a moving frame (or frame field in modern language) corresponding to the family of disk-riding observers, now called Langevin observers. (See the figure.) He also shows that distances measured by nearby Langevin observers correspond to a certain Riemannian metric, now called the Langevin-Landau-Lifschitz metric.
- 1937: Jan Weyssenhoff (now perhaps best known for his work on Cartan connections with zero curvature and nonzero torsion) notices that the Langevin observers are not hypersurface orthogonal. Therefore, the Langevin-Landau-Lifschitz metric is defined, not on some hyperslice of Minkowski spacetime, but on the quotient space obtained by replacing each world line with a point. This gives a three-dimensional smooth manifold which becomes a Riemannian manifold when we add the metric structure.
- 1946: Nathan Rosen shows that inertial observers instantaneously comoving with Langevin observers also measure small distances given by Langevin-Landau-Lifschitz metric.
- 1946: E. L. Hill analyzes relativistic stresses in a material in which (roughly speaking) the speed of sound equals the speed of light and shows these just cancel the radial expansion due to centrifugal force (in any physically realistic material, the relativistic effects lessen but do not cancel the radial expansion). Hill explains errors in earlier analyses by Arthur Eddington and others.
- 1952: C. Møller attempts to study null geodesics from the point of view of rotating observers (but incorrectly tries to use slices rather than the appropriate quotient space)
- 1968: V. Cantoni provides a straightforward, purely kinematical explanation of the paradox by showing that "one of the assumptions implicitly contained in the statement of Ehrenfest's paradox is not correct, the assumption being that the geometry of Minkowski space-time allows the passage of the disk from rest to rotation in such a fashion that both the length of the radius and the length of the periphery, measured with respect to the comoving frame of reference, remain unchanged"
- 1975: Øyvind Grøn writes a classic review paper about solutions of the "paradox".
- 1977: Grünbaum and Janis introduce a notion of physically realizable "non-rigidity" which can be applied to the spin-up of an initially non-rotating disk (this notion is not physically realistic for real materials from which one might make a disk, but it is useful for thought experiments).
- 1981: Grøn notices that Hooke's law is not consistent with Lorentz transformations and introduces a relativistic generalization.
- 1997: T. A. Weber explicitly introduces the frame field associated with Langevin observers.
- 2000: Hrvoje Nikolić points out that the paradox disappears when (in accordance with general theory of relativity) each piece of the rotating disk is treated separately, as living in its own local non-inertial frame.
- 2002: Rizzi and Ruggiero (and Bel) explicitly introduce the quotient manifold mentioned above.
- 2007: Cornwell proposes an alternative resolution of the paradox. He shows that the original and continuing assumption of Lorentz contraction was incorrect and that there is no paradox.
- 2024: Jitendra Kumar analyzes the paradox for a ring and points out that the resolution depends on how the ring is brought from rest to rotational motion, whether by keeping the rest length of the periphery constant (in which case the periphery tears) or by keeping periphery's length in the inertial frame constant (in which case the periphery physically stretches, increasing its rest length).

== Resolution of the paradox ==
Grøn states that the resolution of the paradox stems from the impossibility of synchronizing clocks in a rotating reference frame. If observers on the rotating circumference try to synchronise their clocks around the circumference to establish disc time, there is a time difference between the two end points where they meet.

The modern resolution can be briefly summarized as follows:

1. Small distances measured by disk-riding observers are described by the Langevin-Landau-Lifschitz metric, which is indeed well approximated (for small angular velocity) by the geometry of the hyperbolic plane, just as Kaluza had claimed.
2. For physically reasonable materials, during the spin-up phase a real disk expands radially due to centrifugal forces; relativistic corrections partially counteract (but do not cancel) this Newtonian effect. After a steady-state rotation is achieved and the disk has been allowed to relax, the geometry "in the small" is approximately given by the Langevin–Landau–Lifschitz metric.

== See also ==
- Born coordinates, for a coordinate chart adapted to observers riding on a rigidly rotating disk
- Length contraction
- Relativistic disk

Some other "paradoxes" in special relativity

- Bell's spaceship paradox
- Ladder paradox
- Physical paradox
- Supplee's paradox
- Twin paradox

== Works cited ==
- Einstein, Albert (1922). The Meaning of Relativity. Princeton University Press.
- Fayngold, Moses (2008). Special Relativity and How it Works (illustrated ed.). John Wiley & Sons. p. 363. ISBN 978-3-527-40607-4.
- Grøn, Øyvind; Hervik, Sigbjørn (2007). Einstein's General Theory of Relativity. Springer. p. 91. ISBN 978-0-387-69200-5.
- Stachel, John (1980). "Einstein and the Rigidly Rotating Disk". In Held, A. (ed.). General Relativity and Gravitation. New York: Springer. ISBN 978-0-306-40266-1.

=== A few papers of historical interest ===
- Born, Max (1909), "Die Theorie des starren Körpers in der Kinematik des Relativitätsprinzips" [The Theory of the Rigid Electron in the Kinematics of the Principle of Relativity], Annalen der Physik (in German), 335 (11): 1–56, Bibcode:1909AnP...335....1B, doi:10.1002/andp.19093351102
- Ehrenfest, Paul (1909), "Gleichförmige Rotation starrer Körper und Relativitätstheorie" [Uniform Rotation of Rigid Bodies and the Theory of Relativity], Physikalische Zeitschrift (in German), 10: 918, Bibcode:1909PhyZ...10..918E
- Grøn, Øyvind (2004). "Space Geometry in a Rotating Reference Frame: A Historical Appraisal" (PDF). In Rizzi, G.; Ruggiero, M. (eds.). Relativity in Rotating Frames. Kluwer. pp. 285–334. ISBN 978-1-4020-1805-3. Archived (PDF) from the original on 15 June 2016.
- Grøn, Øyvind; Hervik, Sigbjørn (2007). Einstein's General Theory of Relativity. Springer. p. 91. ISBN 978-0-387-69200-5.
- Herglotz, Gustav (1909), "Über den vom Standpunkt des Relativitätsprinzips aus als starr zu bezeichnenden Körper" [On bodies that are to be designated as "rigid" from the standpoint of the relativity principle], Annalen der Physik (in German), 336 (2): 393–415, Bibcode:1910AnP...336..393H, doi:10.1002/andp.19103360208
- Kaluza, T. (1910). "Zur Relativitätstheorie" [On the Theory of Relativity]. Physikalische Zeitschrift (in German). 11: 977–978.
- Langevin, P. (1935). "Remarques au sujet de la Note de Prunier". C. R. Acad. Sci. Paris (in French). 200: 48.
- Laue, M.v. (1911). "Zur Diskussion über den starren Körper in der Relativitätstheorie" [On the Discussion Concerning Rigid Bodies in the Theory of Relativity]. Physikalische Zeitschrift (in German). 12: 85–87.
- Noether, Fritz (1910). "Zur Kinematik des starren Körpers in der Relativtheorie" (PDF). Annalen der Physik (in German). 336 (5): 919–944. Bibcode:1910AnP...336..919N. doi:10.1002/andp.19103360504.
- Planck, M. (1910). "Gleichförmige Rotation und Lorentz–Kontraktion" [Uniform Rotation and Lorentz Contraction]. Physikalische Zeitschrift (in German). 11: 294.

=== A few classic "modern" references ===
- Cantoni (1968). "What is wrong with Relativistic Kinematics?". Il Nuovo Cimento. 57 B (1): 220–223. Bibcode:1968NCimB..57..220C. doi:10.1007/bf02710332. S2CID 119490975.
- Grøn, Ø. (1975). "Relativistic description of a rotating disk". Am. J. Phys. 43 (10): 869–876. Bibcode:1975AmJPh..43..869G. doi:10.1119/1.9969.
- Grünbaum, Adolf; Janis, Allen I (1977). "The Geometry of the Rotating Disk in the Special Theory of Relativity". In Reichenbach, Hans (ed.). Hans Reichenbach: Logical Empiricist. Springer Netherlands. pp. 321–339. doi:10.1007/978-94-009-9404-1_11. ISBN 978-94-009-9406-5.
- Hill, Edward L. (1946). "A note on the relativistic problem of uniform rotation". Physical Review. 69 (9–10)): 488. Bibcode:1946PhRv...69..488H. doi:10.1103/PhysRev.69.488.
- Lifschitz, E. F.; Landau, L. D. (1980). The Classical Theory of Fields (4th ed.). London: Butterworth-Heinemann. ISBN 978-0-7506-2768-9. See Section 84 and the problem at the end of Section 89.
- Reichenbach, Hans (1969). Axiomatization of the Theory of Relativity. Berkeley: University of California Press. LCCN 68021540.

=== Some experimental work and subsequent discussion ===
- Ashworth, D. G.; Davies, P. A. (1979). "Transformations between inertial and rotating frames of reference". J. Phys. A: Math. Gen. 12 (9): 1425–40. Bibcode:1979JPhA...12.1425A. doi:10.1088/0305-4470/12/9/011.
- Ashworth, D. G.; Jennison, R. C. (1976). "Surveying in rotating systems". J. Phys. A: Math. Gen. 9 (1): 35–43. Bibcode:1976JPhA....9...35A. doi:10.1088/0305-4470/9/1/008.
- Boone, P. F. (1977). "Relativity of rotation". J. Phys. A: Math. Gen. 10 (5): 727–44. Bibcode:1977JPhA...10..727B. doi:10.1088/0305-4470/10/5/007.
- Davies, P. A. (1976). "Measurements in rotating systems". J. Phys. A: Math. Gen. 9 (6): 951–9. Bibcode:1976JPhA....9..951D. doi:10.1088/0305-4470/9/6/014.
- Davies, P. A.; Jennison, R. C. (1975). "Experiments involving mirror transponders in rotating frames". J. Phys. A: Math. Gen. 8 (9): 1390–7. Bibcode:1975JPhA....8.1390D. doi:10.1088/0305-4470/8/9/007.

=== Selected recent sources ===
- Nikolic, Hrvoje (2000). "Relativistic contraction and related effects in noninertial frames". Phys. Rev. A. 61 (3) 032109. arXiv:gr-qc/9904078. Bibcode:2000PhRvA..61c2109N. doi:10.1103/PhysRevA.61.032109. S2CID 5783649. Studies general non-inertial motion of a point particle and treats rotating disk as a collection of such non-inertial particles. See also the eprint version.
- Pauri, Massimo; Vallisneri, Michele (2000). "Märzke–Wheeler coordinates for accelerated observers in special relativity". Found. Phys. Lett. 13 (5): 401–425. arXiv:gr-qc/0006095. Bibcode:2000gr.qc.....6095P. doi:10.1023/A:1007861914639. S2CID 15097773. Studies a coordinate chart constructed using radar distance "in the large" from a single Langevin observer. See also the eprint version.
- Rizzi, G.; Ruggiero, M.L. (2002). "Space geometry of rotating platforms: an operational approach". Found. Phys. 32 (10): 1525–1556. arXiv:gr-qc/0207104. Bibcode:2002gr.qc.....7104R. doi:10.1023/A:1020427318877. S2CID 16826601. They give a precise definition of the "space of the disk" (non-Euclidean), and solve the paradox without extraneous dynamic considerations. See also the eprint version.
- Ruggiero, M. L.; Rizzi, G. (2004). Relativity in Rotating Frames. Dordrecht: Kluwer. ISBN 978-1-4020-1805-3. This book contains a comprehensive historical survey by Øyvind Grøn, on which the "brief history" in this article is based, and some other papers on the Ehrenfest paradox and related controversies. Hundreds of additional references may be found in this book, particularly the paper by Grøn.
- Cornwell, D.T. (2007). "Rotating Frames and Locality; Lorentz Contraction and Ehrenfest's Paradox". Physics Essays. 20: 281–295. Amongst other things, he shows that the linear part of the coordinate transformation between rotating frame coordinates and inertial coordinates is not a Lorentz transformation.
- Kumar, Jitendra (2024). "Ehrenfest paradox: A careful examination". Am. J. Phys. 92 (2): 140–145. arXiv:2305.07953. Bibcode:2024AmJPh..92..140K. doi:10.1119/5.0153190. Considers two ways by which a ring is brought from rest to rotational motion and resolves the paradox for those two cases. See also the eprint version.
