= Øyvind Grøn =

Norwegian physicist (born 1944)

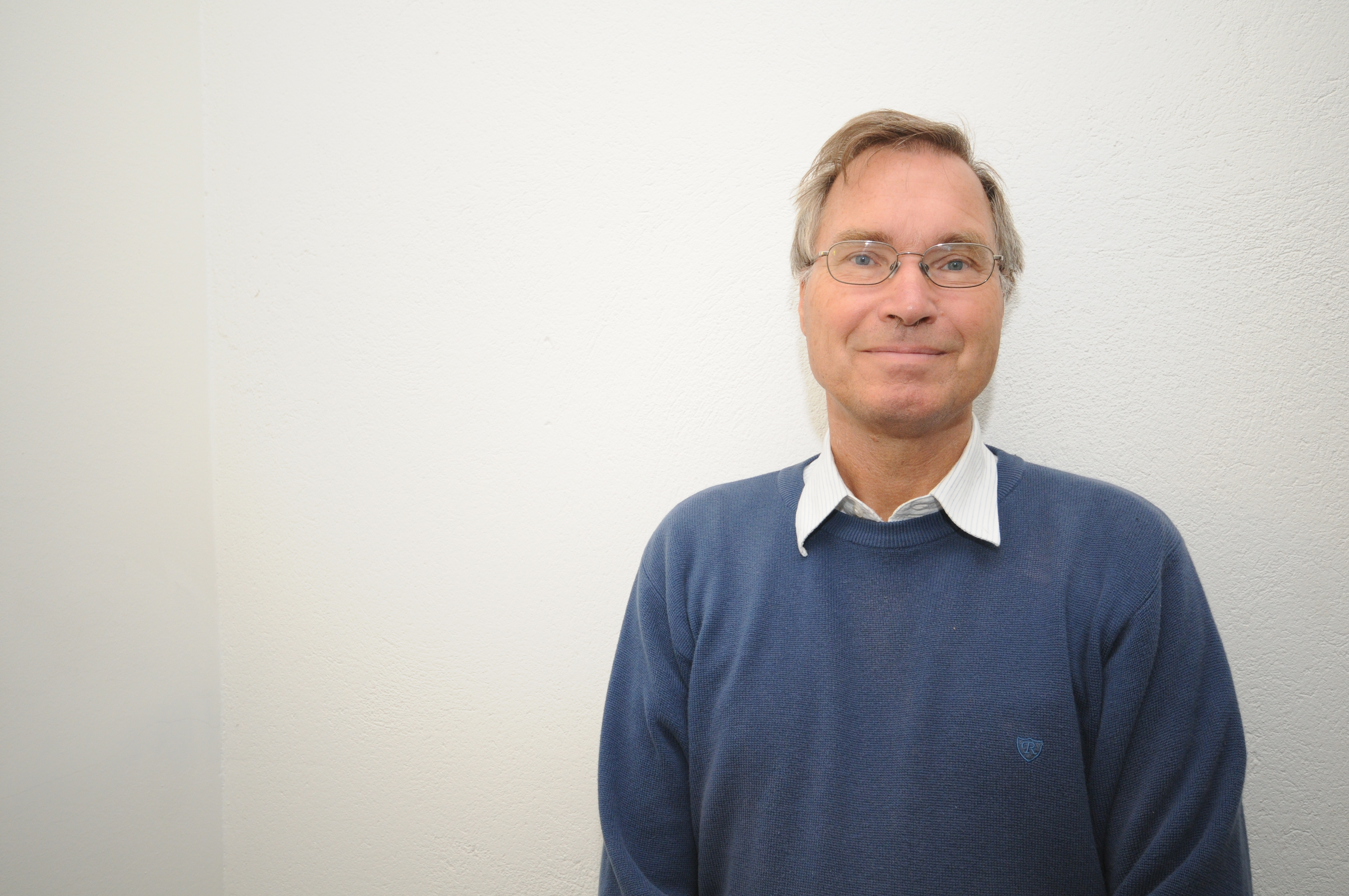
Øyvind Grøn in 2008

Øyvind Grøn (born 11 March 1944) is a Norwegian physicist.

== Biography ==
Grøn was born in Oslo, and is a twin. He took the cand. real. degree at the University of Oslo in 1973, majoring in meteorology. He followed up with the PhD degree in 1990 with a thesis on repulsive gravitation. He started his academic career as a research assistant at the University of Oslo, and has also been a lecturer there. He was appointed as a professor at Oslo University College in 1994, having been an associate professor since 1985. He has also been professor II at the University of Oslo since 1994.

== Scientific contributions ==
=== Rotating reference frames ===
Grøn has conducted research within the areas of general relativity, cosmology and classical electromagnetism. He has thrown new light on themes like the twin paradox, the physics in a rotating reference system (Ehrenfest paradox) and repulsive gravitation associated with vacuum energy. Together with Erik Eriksen at the University of Oslo he has also studied properties of the electromagnetic field produced by accelerated electric charges. They have in particular shown how gravitation impacts such fields. Grøn has also found new solutions to equations in Einstein's theory of gravity that describe time space where one can travel backwards in time. In several studies Grøn has focused on relativistic models of the universe. He has, among other things, shown that it is possible to interpret observations from cosmos so that the concept of dark energy is unnecessary.

=== Repulsive gravitation ===
The relationship between gravitation and time and between gravitation and entropy are also themes where Grøn has contributed several journal articles. He has also contributed to the Kaluza–Klein theory that represents a geometric and unified theory of electromagnetism and gravitation. According to this theory the world is five-dimensional with a compact spatial dimension so small that it is not observable directly. He has shown that the electric field around a charged particle is the projection of the relativistic inertial dragging field caused by the particle's movement around the fifth dimension in our four-dimensional spacetime.

=== Radiation from accelerated charges ===
Grøn (together with Matthew Aadne) have found solutions to the field equations without a cosmological constant for empty space in the theory of gravitation developed by John Nash. They correspond to the solutions of the field equations with a cosmological constant in the gravitational theory developed by Einstein. Since the physical interpretation of the cosmological constant is that it represents the density of dark energy, the solutions indicate that dark energy may be superfluous according to the Nash-theory. Grøn has written three books on the theory of relativity.

Grøn is a member of the editorial board of Universe. He is also known for his popular contributions, through the Norwegian Broadcasting Corporation, in popular articles and lectures, in books as well as the encyclopedias Store norske leksikon and Norsk biografisk leksikon.

== Bibliography ==
- Grøn, Øyvind; Næss, Arne (1998). Introduction to general relativity and its mathematics. HiO-rapport 1998. Vol. 14. Oslo: Høgskolen i Oslo. ISBN 978-82-579-0235-3.
- Grøn, Øyvind; Hervik, Sigbjørn (2007). Einstein's General Theory of Relativity: With Modern Applications in Cosmology. Springer. ISBN 978-0-387-69199-2.
- Grøn, Øyvind (2009). Lecture Notes on the General Theory of Relativity: From Newton's Attractive Gravity to the Repulsive Gravity of Vacuum Energy. Lecture Notes in Physics. Vol. 772. Springer. ISBN 978-0-387-88133-1.
- Grøn, Øyvind; Næss, Arne (2011). Einstein's Theory: A Rigorous Introduction for the Mathematically Untrained. Springer. ISBN 978-1-4614-0705-8.
