= Relativistic disk =

Class of axisymmetric solutions to Einstein's field equations

In general relativity, the relativistic disk expression refers to a class of axi-symmetric self-consistent solutions to Einstein's field equations corresponding to the gravitational field generated by axi-symmetric isolated sources. To find such solutions, one has to pose correctly and solve together the 'outer' problem, a boundary value problem for vacuum Einstein's field equations whose solution determines the external field, and the 'inner' problem, whose solution determines the structure and the dynamics of the matter source in its own gravitational field. Physically reasonable solutions must satisfy some additional conditions such as finiteness and positiveness of mass, physically reasonable kind of matter and finite geometrical size. Exact solutions describing relativistic static thin disks as their sources were first studied by Bonnor and Sackfield and Morgan and Morgan. Subsequently, several classes of exact solutions corresponding to static and stationary thin disks have been obtained by different authors.
