= Hughes–Drever experiment =

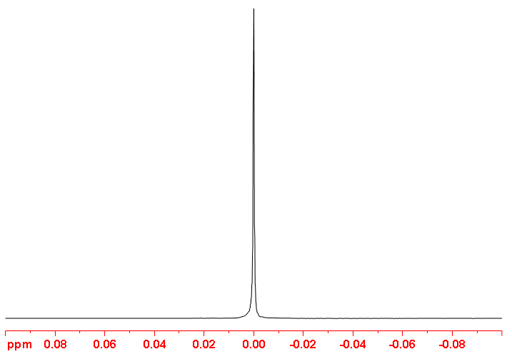
^{7}Li NMR spectrum of LiCl (1M) in D_{2}O. The sharp, unsplit NMR line of this isotope of lithium is evidence for the isotropy of mass and space.

Hughes–Drever experiments (also clock comparison-, clock anisotropy-, mass isotropy-, or energy isotropy experiments) are spectroscopic tests of the isotropy of mass and space. Although originally conceived of as a test of Mach's principle, they are now understood to be an important test of Lorentz invariance. As in Michelson–Morley experiments, the existence of a preferred frame of reference or other deviations from Lorentz invariance can be tested, which also affects the validity of the equivalence principle. Thus these experiments concern fundamental aspects of both special and general relativity. Unlike Michelson–Morley type experiments, Hughes–Drever experiments test the isotropy of the interactions of matter itself, that is, of protons, neutrons, and electrons. The accuracy achieved makes this kind of experiment one of the most accurate confirmations of relativity (see also Tests of special relativity).

== Experiments by Hughes and Drever ==
Giuseppe Cocconi and Edwin Ernest Salpeter (1958) theorized that inertia depends on the surrounding masses according to Mach's principle. Nonuniform distribution of matter thus would lead to anisotropy of inertia in different directions. Heuristic arguments led them to believe that any inertial anisotropy, if one existed, would be dominated by mass contributions from the center of our Milky Way galaxy. They argued that this anisotropy might be observed in two ways: measuring the Zeeman splitting in an atom or measuring the Zeeman splitting in the excited nuclear state of ^{57}Fe using the Mössbauer effect.

Vernon W. Hughes et al. (1960) and Ronald Drever (1961) independently conducted similar spectroscopic experiments to test Mach's principle. However, they didn't use the Mössbauer effect but made magnetic resonance measurements of the nucleus of lithium-7, whose ground state possesses a spin of 3/2. The ground state is split into four equally spaced magnetic energy levels when measured in a magnetic field in accordance with its allowed magnetic quantum number. The nuclear wave functions for the different energy levels have different spatial distributions relative to the magnetic field, and thus have different directional properties. If mass isotropy is satisfied, each transition between a pair of adjacent levels should emit a photon of equal frequency, resulting in a single, sharp spectral line. On the other hand, if inertia has a directional dependence, a triplet or broadened resonance line should be observed. During the 24-hour course of Drever's version of the experiment, the Earth turned, and the magnetic field axis swept different sections of the sky. Drever paid particular attention to the behavior of the spectral line as the magnetic field crossed the center of the galaxy. Neither Hughes nor Drever observed any frequency shift of the energy levels, and due to their experiments' high precision, the maximal anisotropy could be limited to 0.04 Hz = 10^{−25} GeV.

Regarding the consequences of the null result for Mach's principle, it was shown by Robert H. Dicke (1961) that it is in agreement with this principle, as long as the spatial anisotropy is the same for all particles. Thus the null result is rather showing that inertial anisotropy effects are, if they exist, universal for all particles and locally unobservable.

== Modern interpretation ==
While the motivation for this experiment was to test Mach's principle, it has since become recognized as an important test of Lorentz invariance and thus special relativity. This is because anisotropy effects also occur in the presence of a preferred and Lorentz-violating frame of reference – usually identified with the CMBR rest frame as some sort of luminiferous aether (relative velocity about 368 km/s). Therefore, the negative results of the Hughes–Drever experiments (as well as the Michelson–Morley experiments) rule out the existence of such a frame. In particular, Hughes–Drever tests of Lorentz violations are often described by a test theory of special relativity put forward by Clifford Will. According to this model, Lorentz violations in the presence of preferred frames can lead to differences between the maximal attainable velocity of massive particles and the speed of light. If they were different, the properties and frequencies of matter interactions would change as well. In addition, it is a fundamental consequence of the equivalence principle of general relativity that Lorentz invariance locally holds in freely moving reference frames = local Lorentz invariance (LLI). This means that the results of this experiment concern both special and general relativity.

Due to the fact that different frequencies ("clocks") are compared, these experiments are also denoted as clock-comparison experiments.

== Recent experiments ==
Besides Lorentz violations due to a preferred frame or influences based on Mach's principle, spontaneous violations of Lorentz invariance and CPT symmetry are also being searched for, motivated by the predictions of various quantum gravity models that suggest their existence. Modern updates of the Hughes–Drever experiments have been conducted studying possible Lorentz and CPT violation in neutrons and protons. Using spin-polarized systems and co-magnetometers (to suppress magnetic influences), the accuracy and sensitivity of these experiments have been greatly increased. In addition, by using spin-polarized torsion balances, the electron sector has also been tested.

All of these experiments have thus far given negative results, so there is still no sign of the existence of a preferred frame or any other form of Lorentz violation. The values of the following table are related to the coefficients given by the Standard-Model Extension (SME), an often used effective field theory to assess possible Lorentz violations (see also other Test theories of special relativity). From that, any deviation of Lorentz invariance can be connected with specific coefficients. Since a series of coefficients are tested in those experiments, only the value of maximal sensitivity is given (for precise data, see the individual articles):

Author	Year	SME constraints			Description
Author	Year	Proton	Neutron	Electron	Description
Prestage et al.	1985		10^{−27}		Comparing the nuclear spin-flip transition of ^{9}Be^{+} (stored in a penning trap) with a hydrogen maser transition.
Phillips	1987			10^{−27}	Sinusoidal oscillations were investigated using a cryogenic spin-torsion pendulum carrying a transversely polarized magnet.
Lamoreaux et al.	1989		10^{−29}		They induced dipole and quadrupole spin polarization into a vapor of ^{201}Hg, by which quadrupole energy shifts can be observed.
Chupp et al.	1989		10^{−27}		Time-dependent quadrupole splitting of Zeeman levels is investigated. ^{21}Ne and ^{3}He gases are polarized by spin exchange and compared.
Wineland et al.	1991			10^{−25}	The anomalous dipole-monopole and dipole-dipole couplings are investigated, by examining hyperfine resonances in ^{9}Be^{+}.
Wang et al.	1993			10^{−27}	A spin-torsion pendulum carrying a spin-polarized Dy–Fe mass is investigated for sidereal variations.
Berglund et al.	1995	10^{−27}	10^{−30}	10^{−27}	The frequencies of ^{199}Hg and ^{133}Cs are compared by applying a magnetic field.
Bear et al.	2000		10^{−31}		The frequencies of ^{129}Xe and ^{3}He Zeeman masers are compared.
Phillips et al.	2000	10^{−27}			The Zeeman frequency is measured using hydrogen masers.
Humphrey et al.	2003	10^{−27}		10^{−27}	Similar to Phillips et al. (2000).
Hou et al.	2003			10^{−29}	Similar to Wang et al. (1993).
Canè et al.	2004		10^{−32}		Similar to Bear et al. (2000).
Wolf et al.	2006	10^{−25}			Atomic frequencies are measured using laser cooled ^{133}Cs atomic fountains.
Heckel et al.	2006			10^{−30}	They used a spin-torsion pendulum with four sections of Alnico and four sections of Sm_{5}Co.
Heckel et al.	2008			10^{−31}	Similar to Heckel et al. (2006).
Altarev et al.	2009		10^{−29}		The spin-precession frequencies in stored ultracold neutrons and ^{199}Hg are analyzed.
Brown et al.	2010	10^{−32}	10^{−33}		Comparing the frequencies in a K / ^{3}He comagnetometer.
Gemmel et al.	2010		10^{−32}		Comparing the frequencies in a ^{129}Xe / ^{3}He comagnetometer.
Smiciklas et al.	2011		10^{−29}		Comparing the frequencies in a ^{21}Ne / Rb / K comagnetometer. Test of the maximal attainable velocity of neutrons.
Peck et al.	2012	10^{−30}	10^{−31}		Similar to Berglund et al. (1995).
Hohensee et al.	2013			10^{−17}	Measuring the transition frequencies of two nearly degenerate states of ^{164}Dy and ^{162}Dy. Test of the maximal attainable velocity of electrons.
Allmendinger et al.	2013		10^{−34}		Similar to Gemmel et al. (2010).
