= Doubly special relativity =

Generalization of special relativity

Doubly special relativity (DSR) – also called deformed special relativity – is a modified theory of special relativity in which there is not only an observer-independent maximum velocity (the speed of light), but also an observer-independent maximum energy scale (the Planck energy) and/or a minimum length scale (the Planck length). This contrasts with other Lorentz-violating theories, such as the Standard-Model Extension, where Lorentz invariance is instead broken by the presence of a preferred frame. The main motivation for this theory is that the Planck energy should be the scale where as yet unknown quantum gravity effects become important and, due to invariance of physical laws, this scale should remain fixed in all inertial frames.

== History ==
First attempts to modify special relativity by introducing an observer-independent length were made by Pavlopoulos (1967), who estimated this length at about 10^{−15} metres. In the context of quantum gravity, Giovanni Amelino-Camelia (2000) introduced what is now called doubly special relativity, by proposing a specific realization of preserving invariance of the Planck length 1.616255×10^{−35} m. This was reformulated by Kowalski-Glikman (2001) in terms of an observer-independent Planck mass. A different model, inspired by that of Amelino-Camelia, was proposed in 2001 by João Magueijo and Lee Smolin, who also focused on the invariance of Planck energy.

It was realized that there are, indeed, three kinds of deformation of special relativity that allow one to achieve an invariance of the Planck energy; either as a maximum energy, as a maximal momentum, or both. DSR models are possibly related to loop quantum gravity in 2+1 dimensions (two space, one time), and it has been conjectured that a relation also exists in 3+1 dimensions.

The motivation for these proposals is mainly theoretical, based on the following observation: The Planck energy is expected to play a fundamental role in a theory of quantum gravity; setting the scale at which quantum gravity effects cannot be neglected and new phenomena might become important. If special relativity is to hold up exactly to this scale, different observers would observe quantum gravity effects at different scales, due to the Lorentz–FitzGerald contraction, in contradiction to the principle that all inertial observers should be able to describe phenomena by the same physical laws. This motivation has been criticized, on the grounds that the result of a Lorentz transformation does not itself constitute an observable phenomenon. DSR also suffers from several inconsistencies in formulation that have yet to be resolved. Most notably, it is difficult to recover the standard transformation behavior for macroscopic bodies, known as the soccer ball problem. The other conceptual difficulty is that DSR is a priori formulated in momentum space. There is, as of yet, no consistent formulation of the model in position space.

== Predictions ==
Experiments to date have not observed contradictions to Special Relativity.

It was initially speculated that ordinary special relativity and doubly special relativity would make distinct physical predictions in high-energy processes and, in particular, the derivation of the GZK limit on energies of cosmic rays from distant sources would not be valid. However, it is now established that standard doubly special relativity does not predict any suppression of the GZK cutoff, contrary to the models where an absolute local rest frame exists, such as effective field theories like the Standard-Model Extension.

Since DSR generically (though not necessarily) implies an energy-dependence of the speed of light, it has further been predicted that, if there are modifications to first order in energy over the Planck mass, this energy-dependence would be observable in high energetic photons reaching Earth from distant gamma ray bursts. Depending on whether the now energy-dependent speed of light increases or decreases with energy (a model-dependent feature), highly energetic photons would be faster or slower than the lower energetic ones. However, the Fermi-LAT experiment in 2009 measured a 31 GeV photon, which nearly simultaneously arrived with other photons from the same burst, which excluded such dispersion effects even above the Planck energy. Moreover, it has been argued that DSR, with an energy-dependent speed of light, is inconsistent and first order effects are ruled out already because they would lead to non-local particle interactions that would long have been observed in particle physics experiments.

== De Sitter relativity ==
Since the de Sitter group naturally incorporates an invariant length parameter, de Sitter relativity can be interpreted as an example of doubly special relativity because de Sitter spacetime incorporates invariant velocity, as well as length parameter. There is a fundamental difference, though: whereas in all doubly special relativity models the Lorentz symmetry is violated, in de Sitter relativity it remains as a physical symmetry. A drawback of the usual doubly special relativity models is that they are valid only at the energy scales where ordinary special relativity is supposed to break down, giving rise to a patchwork relativity. On the other hand, de Sitter relativity is found to be invariant under a simultaneous re-scaling of mass, energy and momentum, and is consequently valid at all energy scales.

== See also ==
- Planck scale
- Planck units
- Planck epoch
- Fock–Lorentz symmetry
