= Preferred =

Preferred may refer to:

- Chase Sapphire Preferred, a credit card
- Preferred frame, in physics, a special hypothetical frame of reference
- Preferred number, standard guidelines for choosing exact product dimensions within a given set of constraints
- Preferred stock, a class of stock

== See also ==
- Preference
