= Bumblebee models =

Models spontaneously breaking Lorentz symmetry

Bumblebee models are effective field theories describing a vector field with a vacuum expectation value that spontaneously breaks Lorentz symmetry. A bumblebee model is the simplest case of a theory with spontaneous Lorentz symmetry breaking.

The development of bumblebee models was motivated primarily by the discovery that mechanisms in string theory (and subsequently other quantum theories of gravity) can lead to tensor-valued fields acquiring vacuum expectation values. Bumblebee models are different from local U(1) gauge theories. Nevertheless, in some bumblebee models, massless modes that behave like photons can appear.

== Introduction ==
Alan Kostelecký and Stuart Samuel showed in 1989 that mechanisms arising in the context of string theory can lead to spontaneous breaking of Lorentz symmetry. A set of models at the level of effective field theory were defined that contained gravitational fields and a vector field B_{μ} that has a nonzero vacuum expectation value, <B_{μ}> = b_{μ}. These have become known as bumblebee models.

Typically in these models, spontaneous Lorentz violation is caused by the presence of a potential term in the action. The vacuum value b_{μ}, along with a background metric, give a solution that minimizes the bumblebee potential.

The vacuum value b_{μ} acts as a fixed background field that spontaneously breaks Lorentz symmetry. It is an example, for the case of a vector, of a coefficient for Lorentz violation as defined in the Standard-Model Extension.

The name bumblebee model, coined by Kostelecký, is based on an insect whose ability to fly has sometimes been questioned on theoretical grounds, but which nonetheless is able to fly successfully.

== Lagrangian ==
Different examples of bumblebee Lagrangians can be constructed. Their expressions include kinetic terms for the gravitational and bumblebee fields, a potential V that induces spontaneous Lorentz breaking, and matter terms. In addition, there can be couplings between the gravitational, bumblebee, and matter fields.

One example, with conventional Einstein–Hilbert and cosmological-constant terms for the gravity sector is the Lagrangian:

$$\begin{align}
{\mathcal L}_B &= \frac{1}{16\pi G} (R - 2 \Lambda)
+ \sigma_1 B^\mu B^\nu R_{\mu\nu}
+ \sigma_2 B^\mu B_\mu R
- \frac{1}{4} \tau_1 B_{\mu\nu} B^{\mu\nu}
\\
&\quad
+ \frac{1}{2} \tau_2 D_\mu B_\nu D^\mu B^\nu
+ \frac{1}{2} \tau_3 D_\mu B^\mu D_\nu B^\nu
- V(B_\mu B^\mu \mp b^2) + {\mathcal L}_{\rm M} .
\end{align}$$

In this expression, $D_\mu\Big.$ is the covariant derivative, $B_{\mu\nu} = D_\mu B_\nu - D_\nu B_\mu\Big.$, and the terms are controlled by a set of constants, $\sigma_1\Big.$, $\sigma_2\Big.$, $\tau_1\Big.$, $\tau_2\Big.$, $\tau_3\Big.$. The matter-sector Lagrangian, ${\mathcal L}_{\rm M}$, can include couplings to B_{μ}.

The potential $V(B_\mu B^\mu \mp b^2)$ in this example is assumed to have a minimum when

$$B_\mu B^\mu \mp b^2 = 0 .$$

This condition is satisfied when the vector field has a vacuum value b_{μ} obeying b_{μ}b^{μ} = ±b^{2}. The value of the constant ±b^{2} in the potential determines whether the vacuum vector is timelike, lightlike, or spacelike.

One commonly used example for the potential is a smooth quadratic function,

$$V = \frac{1}{2} \kappa (B_\mu B^\mu \mp b^2)^2 ,$$

where $\kappa\Big.$ is a constant. With this choice, a massive mode can appear in the theory for values of B_{μ} that do not minimize the potential V.

Another common choice uses a Lagrange-multiplier field and is given as

$$V = \lambda (B_\mu B^\mu \mp b^2) .$$

In this case, the massive mode is frozen out. However, the Lagrange-multiplier field λ takes its place as an additional degree of freedom in the theory.

In the limit where the potential term V is removed from the theory, bumblebee models reduce to examples of vector-tensor theories of gravity.

The special Lagrangian ${\mathcal L}_B$ with $\tau_1 =1\Big.$, and $\sigma_1 = \sigma_2 = \tau_2 = \tau_3 = 0\Big.$ is the original type of model examined by Kostelecký and Samuel, known as the KS bumblebee model. The Lagrangian in this case has a Maxwell form for the bumblebee kinetic term, and is given as

$${\mathcal L}_{\rm KS} = \frac{1}{16 \pi G} (R - 2 \Lambda )
- \frac{1}{4} B_{\mu\nu} B^{\mu\nu}
- V(B_\mu B^\mu \pm b^2) + B_\mu J^\mu
+ {\mathcal L}_{\rm M}.$$

For this reason, B_{μ} can be thought of as a generalized vector potential, and interactions with a matter current $J^\mu\Big.$ can be included.

The special Lagrangian ${\mathcal L}_B$ with $\tau_1 =1\Big.$, $\sigma_1 = \xi/16 \pi G\Big.$, and $\sigma_2 = \tau_2 = \tau_3 = 0\Big.$, is similar to the KS model, but includes nonminimal gravitational couplings parameterized by a coupling $\xi\Big.$. The Lagrangian in this case is:

$${\mathcal L} = \frac{1}{16 \pi G} (R - 2 \Lambda
+ \xi B^\mu B^\nu R_{\mu\nu} )
- \frac{1}{4} B_{\mu\nu} B^{\mu\nu}
- V(B_\mu B^\mu \pm b^2) + B_\mu J^\mu
+ {\mathcal L}_{\rm M}.$$

In all bumblebee models, the Lagrangian is invariant under both local Lorentz transformations and diffeomorphisms. A vierbein formalism can be used to introduce local components for the metric, bumblebee, and matter fields at every spacetime point. Spontaneous Lorentz violation occurs when the bumblebee field has a nonzero vacuum value in the local Lorentz frames.

The vierbein formalism is useful in expressing the structures of bumblebee theories. For example, it provides a natural way to express the direct link between spontaneous Lorentz breaking and diffeomorphism breaking. The spacetime vacuum value b_{μ} is obtained when the vacuum solution for the vierbein acts on the local vacuum value for the vector field. The result is a fixed background field in the spacetime frame, which spontaneously breaks particle diffeomorphisms.

== Nambu–Goldstone and massive modes ==
Bumblebee models are useful for exploring the effects of spontaneous Lorentz violation in gravitational theories. These effects include the existence of Nambu–Goldstone modes, massive (Higgs) modes, and the possibility of a Higgs mechanism. In bumblebee models, Lorentz and diffeomorphism symmetry are spontaneously broken, so these effects have to be considered in the context of both types of symmetry breaking.

Nambu–Goldstone modes appear when a continuous symmetry is spontaneously broken. The Nambu–Goldstone modes can be thought of as excitations generated by the broken symmetries that stay in the degenerate vacuum of the theory. In contrast, massive (Higgs) modes are excitations that do not stay in the potential minimum. In this sense, the massive modes are orthogonal to the Nambu–Goldstone excitations.

In bumblebee models, the excitations generated by the broken diffeomorphisms are contained in both the vector field B_{μ} and the metric g_{μν}. Different gauge choices can be made that effectively move the Nambu–Goldstone degrees of freedom between these fields. For a wide range of models, including the KS bumblebee with a constant value of b_{μ}, the diffeomorphism Nambu–Goldstone modes do not propagate as physical massless modes. Instead, they are auxiliary modes.

Different gauge choices also affect the interpretation of the Nambu–Goldstone modes that arise from spontaneous Lorentz breaking. In the most general bumblebee models, gauge fixing for the Lorentz transformations and diffeomorphisms can be made so that all of the Nambu–Goldstone modes are contained in the gravitational sector, either in the vierbein or, in some cases, in the metric alone. With these choices, the bumblebee models are treated as alternative theories of gravity.

For the general model with Lagrangian ${\mathcal L}_B$, with unrestricted values of the constants $\sigma_1\Big.$, $\sigma_2\Big.$, $\tau_1\Big.$, $\tau_2\Big.$, $\tau_3\Big.$, the Nambu–Goldstone modes include both propagating massless modes and ghost modes. One line of investigation is to search for restricted values of the parameters that eliminate the ghosts as propagating modes.

In the KS bumblebee model, the only propagating Nambu–Goldstone modes are two transverse massless modes, which have properties similar to the photon in an axial gauge. The propagating gravity modes describe the usual graviton modes in general relativity.

In addition to the Nambu–Goldstone modes, there is a combined excitation in B_{μ} and g_{μν} that does not stay in the potential minimum. It is a massive mode, similar to a Higgs excitation in the electroweak model.

In KS bumblebee models, the massive-mode excitation acts as a background source of gravity and as a background source of charge density. The stability of the theory is affected by the behavior of the massive mode, which represents an additional degree of freedom compared to Einstein–Maxwell theory.

In the KS model, it can be shown that suitable initial conditions exist that set the massive mode to zero for all time. Alternatively, when the mass scale of the massive mode becomes large, its effects are greatly suppressed. In the limit of an infinite mass scale for the massive mode, the KS model is found to be equivalent to Einstein–Maxwell theory in a fixed axial gauge.

Note that other models besides the bumblebee allow known massless particles to arise as Nambu–Goldstone modes. For example, the cardinal model is based on a symmetric two-tensor. The modes resulting from spontaneous Lorentz breaking in this model can be equated with the graviton.

== Photons from spontaneous Lorentz violation ==
The idea that the photon could emerge as Nambu–Goldstone modes in a theory with spontaneous Lorentz violation first arose in the context of special relativity.

In 1951, Paul Dirac considered a vector theory with a Lagrange-multiplier potential as an alternative model giving rise to the charge of the electron. It was later recognized that this was a theory with spontaneous Lorentz breaking.

Twelve years later, in 1963, James Bjorken proposed a model in which collective excitations of a fermion field could lead to composite photons emerging as Nambu–Goldstone modes. The observable behavior of the photon in this original model was claimed to be equivalent to electrodynamics.

Subsequently, in 1968, Yoichiro Nambu introduced a vector model that did not involve a symmetry-breaking potential. Instead, the constraint that the vector field have a fixed norm was introduced directly, and the resulting theory, which does not contain a massive mode, was shown to be equivalent to electromagnetism in a fixed gauge.

The KS bumblebee model, which includes gravitational fields in addition to the vector field, extends the idea of photons arising as Nambu–Goldstone modes from special relativity into general relativity.

In the KS model, there is no local U(1) gauge symmetry. Instead, there are both massless Nambu–Goldstone modes and a massive mode as a result of spontaneous Lorentz violation. In the limit of infinite mass, the photon appears as massless Nambu–Goldstone modes.

== Higgs mechanism ==
Because Lorentz symmetry is a local symmetry in the presence of gravity, the possibility of a Higgs mechanism arises when Lorentz symmetry is spontaneously broken. In the conventional gauge-theory Higgs mechanism, the Nambu–Goldstone modes are reinterpreted as degrees of freedom associated with a massive gauge field. The Nambu–Goldstone modes are said to be eaten, while the gauge bosons gain a mass.

The possibility that a gravitational Higgs mechanism in bumblebee models could endow the graviton with mass was considered by Kostelecky and Samuel. They showed, however, that what appears to be a mass term involves the square of the affine connection $\Gamma^\lambda_{\,\,\mu\nu}$. Since the connection is a function of derivatives of the metric, this cannot be a mass term. Thus, there is no conventional Higgs mechanism in bumblebee models that results in a massive graviton.

This result assumed that the spacetime is a Riemann spacetime. If instead a Riemann–Cartan spacetime is considered, then a Higgs mechanism does become possible. However, in this case, it is not the graviton that acquires a mass. Instead, it is the spin connection that becomes massive through spontaneous Lorentz breaking.

In Riemann–Cartan spacetime, covariant derivatives that act on local tensors involve the spin connection. Since this type of geometry includes torsion, the spin connection provides an additional set of dynamical degrees of freedom that can propagate.

Bumblebee models in Riemann–Cartan spacetime lead to mass terms for the spin connection through spontaneous breaking of local Lorentz symmetry. The resulting Nambu–Goldstone modes can be reinterpreted, as in a Higgs mechanism, as degrees of freedom that make the spin connection massive. However, finding suitable kinetic terms for the resulting massive spin connection, free of ghosts and tachyons, remains an open problem.

== See also ==
- Standard-Model Extension
- Riemann–Cartan geometry
- Antimatter tests of Lorentz violation
- Lorentz-violating neutrino oscillations
- Lorentz-violating electrodynamics
