= Stuart Samuel =

Stuart Samuel may refer to:

- Stuart Samuel (politician), British banker and politician
- Stuart Samuel (physicist), American physicist
