= Lorentz-violating electrodynamics =

Test of special relativity

Searches for Lorentz violation involving photons provide one possible test of relativity. Examples range from modern versions of the classic Michelson–Morley experiment that utilize highly stable electromagnetic resonant cavities to searches for tiny deviations from c in the speed of light emitted by distant astrophysical sources. Due to the extreme distances involved, astrophysical studies have achieved sensitivities on the order of parts in 10^{38}.

== Minimal Lorentz-violating electrodynamics ==
The most general framework for studies of relativity violations is an effective field theory called the Standard-Model Extension (SME). Lorentz-violating operators in the SME are classified by their mass dimension $d$. To date, the most widely studied limit of the SME is the minimal SME, which limits attention to operators of renormalizable mass-dimension, $d=3,4$, in flat spacetime. Within the minimal SME, photons are governed by the Lagrangian density

$$\mathcal{L} =
-\textstyle{{1}\over{4}}\,F_{\mu\nu}F^{\mu\nu}
+\textstyle{{1}\over{2}}\,(k_\mathrm{AF})^\kappa\,\epsilon_{\kappa\lambda\mu\nu}A^\lambda F^{\mu\nu}
-\textstyle{{1}\over{4}}\,(k_{\mathrm F})_{\kappa\lambda\mu\nu}F^{\kappa\lambda}F^{\mu\nu}.$$

The first term on the right-hand side is the conventional Maxwell Lagrangian and gives rise to the usual source-free Maxwell equations. The next term violates both Lorentz and CPT invariance and is constructed from a dimension $d=3$ operator and a constant coefficient for Lorentz violation $(k_\mathrm{AF})^\kappa$. The second term introduces Lorentz violation, but preserves CPT invariance. It consists of a dimension $d=4$ operator contracted with constant coefficients for Lorentz violation $(k_{\mathrm F})_{\kappa\lambda\mu\nu}$. There are a total of four independent $(k_\mathrm{AF})^\kappa$ coefficients and nineteen $(k_{\mathrm F})_{\kappa\lambda\mu\nu}$ coefficients. Both Lorentz-violating terms are invariant under observer Lorentz transformations, implying that the physics in independent of observer or coordinate choice. However, the coefficient tensors $(k_\mathrm{AF})^\kappa$ and $(k_{\mathrm F})_{\kappa\lambda\mu\nu}$ are outside the control of experimenters and can be viewed as constant background fields that fill the entire Universe, introducing directionality to the otherwise isotropic spacetime. Photons interact with these background fields and experience frame-dependent effects, violating Lorentz invariance.

The mathematics describing Lorentz violation in photons is similar to that of conventional electromagnetism in dielectrics. As a result, many of the effects of Lorentz violation are also seen in light passing through transparent materials. These include changes in the speed that can depend on frequency, polarization, and direction of propagation. Consequently, Lorentz violation can introduce dispersion in light propagating in empty space. It can also introduce birefringence, an effect seen in crystals such as calcite. The best constraints on Lorentz violation come from constraints on birefringence in light from astrophysical sources.

== Nonminimal Lorentz-violating electrodynamics ==
The full SME incorporates general relativity and curved spacetimes. It also includes operators of arbitrary (nonrenormalizable) dimension $d \geq 5$. The general gauge-invariant photon sector was constructed in 2009 by Kostelecky and Mewes. It was shown that the more general theory could be written in a form similar to the minimal case,

$$\mathcal{L} =
-\textstyle{1\over4} F_{\mu\nu}F^{\mu\nu}
+\textstyle{1\over2} \epsilon^{\kappa\lambda\mu\nu} A_\lambda {(\hat k_\mathrm{AF})}_\kappa F_{\mu\nu}
- \textstyle{1\over4} F_{\kappa\lambda} {(\hat k_{\mathrm F})}^{\kappa\lambda\mu\nu} F_{\mu\nu} \,,$$

where the constant coefficients are promoted to operators ${(\hat k_\mathrm{AF})}_\kappa$ and ${(\hat k_{\mathrm F})}^{\kappa\lambda\mu\nu}$, which take the form of power series in spacetime derivatives. The ${(\hat k_\mathrm{AF})}_\kappa$ operator contains all the CPT-odd $d=3,5,7,\ldots$ terms, while the CPT-even terms with $d=4,6,8,\ldots$ are in ${(\hat k_{\mathrm F})}^{\kappa\lambda\mu\nu}$. While the nonrenormalizable terms give many of the same types of signatures as the $d=3,4$ case, the effects generally grow faster with frequency, due to the additional derivatives. More complex directional dependence typically also arises. Vacuum dispersion of light without birefringence is another feature that is found, which does not arise in the minimal SME.

== Experiments ==
=== Vacuum birefringence ===
Birefringence of light occurs when the solutions to the modified Lorentz-violating Maxwell equations give rise to polarization-dependent speeds. Light propagates as the combination of two orthogonal polarizations that propagate at slightly different phase velocities. A gradual change in the relative phase results as one of the polarizations outpaces the other. The total polarization (the sum of the two) evolves as the light propagates, in contrast to the Lorentz-invariant case where the polarization of light remains fixed when propagating in a vacuum. In the CPT-odd case (d ∈ {odd} ), birefringence causes a simple rotation of the polarization. The CPT-even case (d ∈ {even} ) gives more complicated behavior as linearly polarized light evolves into elliptically polarizations.

The quantity determining the size of the effect is the change in relative phase, $\Delta\phi = 2\pi\Delta v\, t/\lambda$, where $\Delta v$ is the difference in phase speeds, $t$ is the propagation time, and $\lambda$ is the wavelength. For $d>3$, the highest sensitivities are achieved by considering high-energy photons from distant sources, giving large values to the ratio $t/\lambda$ that enhance the sensitivity to $\Delta v$. The best constraints on vacuum birefringence from $d>3$ Lorentz violation come from polarimetry studies of gamma-ray bursts. For example, sensitivities of 10^{−38} to the $d=4$ coefficients for Lorentz violation have been achieved. For $d=3$, the velocity difference $\Delta v$ is proportional to the wavelength, canceling the $\lambda$ dependence in the phase shift, implying there is no benefit to considering higher energies. As a result, maximum sensitivity is achieved by studying the most distant source available, the cosmic microwave background (CMB). Constraints on $d=3$ coefficients for Lorentz violation from the CMB currently stand at around 10^{−43} GeV.

=== Vacuum dispersion ===
Lorentz violation with $d \neq 4$ can lead to frequency-dependent light speeds. To search for this effect, researchers compare the arrival times of photons from distant sources of pulsed radiation, such as gamma-ray bursts or pulsars. Assuming photons of all energies are produced within a narrow window of time, dispersion would cause higher-energy photons to run ahead or behind lower-energy photons, leading to otherwise unexplained energy dependence in the arrival time. For two photons of two different energies, the difference in arrival times is approximately given by the ratio $\Delta t = \Delta v L / c^2$, where $\Delta v$ is the difference in the group velocity and $L$ is the distance traveled. Sensitivity to Lorentz violation is then increased by considering very distant sources with rapidly changing time profiles. The speed difference $\Delta v$ grows as $E^{d-4}$, so higher-energy sources provide better sensitivity to effects from $d>4$ Lorentz violation, making gamma-ray bursts an ideal source.

Dispersion may or may not be accompanied by birefringence. Polarization studies typically achieved sensitivities well beyond those achievable through dispersion. As a result, most searches for dispersion focus on Lorentz violation that leads to dispersion but not birefringence. The SME shows that dispersion without birefringence can only arise from operators of even dimension $d$. Consequently, the energy dependence in the light speed from nonbirefringent Lorentz violation can be quadratic $E^2$ or quartic $E^4$ or any other even power of energy. Odd powers of energy, such as linear $E$ and cubic $E^3$, do not arise in effective field theory.

=== Resonant cavities ===
While extreme sensitivity to Lorentz violation is achieved in astrophysical studies, most forms of Lorentz violation have little to no effect on light propagating in a vacuum. These types of violations cannot be tested using astrophysical tests, but can be sought in laboratory-based experiments involving electromagnetic fields. The primary examples are the modern Michelson-Morley experiments based on electromagnetic resonant cavities, which have achieved sensitivities on the order of parts in 10^{18} to Lorentz violation.

Resonant cavities support electromagnetic standing waves that oscillate at well-defined frequencies determined by the Maxwell equations and the geometry of the cavity. The Lorentz-violating modifications to the Maxwell equations lead to tiny shifts in the resonant frequencies. Experimenters search for these tiny shifts by comparing two or more cavities at different orientations. Since rotation-symmetry violation is a form of Lorentz violation, the resonant frequencies may depend on the orientation of the cavity. So, two cavities with different orientations may give different frequencies even if they are otherwise identical. A typical experiment compares the frequencies of two identical cavities oriented at right angles in the laboratory. To distinguish between frequency differences of more conventional origins, such as small defects in the cavities, and Lorentz violation, the cavities are typically placed on a turntable and rotated in the laboratory. The orientation dependence from Lorentz violation would cause the frequency difference to change as the cavities rotate.

Several classes of cavity experiment exist with different sensitivities to different types of Lorentz violation. Microwave and optical cavities have been used to constrain $d=4$ violations. Microwave experiments have also placed some bounds on nonminimal $d=6$ and $d=8$ violations. However, for $d>4$, the effects of Lorentz violation grow with frequency, so optical cavities provide better sensitivity to nonrenormalizable violations, all else being equal. The geometrical symmetries of the cavity also affect the sensitivity since parity symmetric cavities are only directly sensitive to parity-even coefficients for Lorentz violation. Ring resonators provide a complementary class of cavity experiment that can test parity-odd violations. In a ring resonator, two modes propagating in opposites directions in the same ring are compared, rather than modes in two different cavities.

=== Other experiments ===
A number of other searches for Lorentz violation in photons have been performed that do not fall under the above categories. These include accelerator based experiments, atomic clocks, and threshold analyses.

The results of experimental searches of Lorentz invariance violation in the photon sector of the SME are summarized in the Data Tables for Lorentz and CPT violation.

== See also ==
- Standard-Model Extension
- Lorentz-violating neutrino oscillations
- Antimatter tests of Lorentz violation
- Bumblebee models
- Tests of special relativity
- Test theories of special relativity
