= Test theory =

In experimental physics, a test theory tells experimenters how to perform particular comparisons between specific theories or classes of theory.

Without a good reference test theory, these experiments can be difficult to construct. Different theories often define relationships and parameters in different, often incompatible, ways. Sometimes, physical theories and models that nominally produce significantly diverging predictions can be found to produce very similar, even identical, predictions, once definitional differences are taken into account.

A good test theory should identify potential sources of definitional bias in the way that experiments are constructed. It should also be able to deal with a wide range of possible objections to experimental tests based upon it. Discovery that a test theory has serious omissions can undermine the validity of experimental work that is designed according to that theory.

== Examples ==
Parameterized post-Newtonian formalism is used to compare theories of gravity.

Test theories of special relativity are useful when designing experiments to look for possible violations of Poincare symmetry.
