= Standard-Model Extension =

Extension to the Standard Model

Standard-Model Extension (SME) is an effective field theory that contains the Standard Model, general relativity, and all possible operators that break Lorentz symmetry. Violations of this fundamental symmetry can be studied within this general framework. CPT violation implies the breaking of Lorentz symmetry, and the SME includes operators that both break and preserve CPT symmetry.

== Development ==
In 1989, Alan Kostelecký and Stuart Samuel proved that interactions in string theories could lead to the spontaneous breaking of Lorentz symmetry. Later studies have indicated that loop-quantum gravity, non-commutative field theories, brane-world scenarios, and random dynamics models also involve the breakdown of Lorentz invariance. Interest in Lorentz violation has grown rapidly in the last decades because it can arise in these and other candidate theories for quantum gravity. In the early 1990s, it was shown in the context of bosonic superstrings that string interactions can also spontaneously break CPT symmetry. This work suggested that experiments with kaon interferometry would be promising for seeking possible signals of CPT violation due to their high sensitivity.

The SME was conceived to facilitate experimental investigations of Lorentz and CPT symmetry, given the theoretical motivation for violation of these symmetries. An initial step, in 1995, was the introduction of effective interactions. Although Lorentz-breaking interactions are motivated by constructs such as string theory, the low-energy effective action appearing in the SME is independent of the underlying theory. Each term in the effective theory involves the expectation of a tensor field in the underlying theory. These coefficients are small due to Planck-scale suppression, and in principle are measurable in experiments. The first case considered the mixing of neutral mesons, because their interferometric nature makes them highly sensitive to suppressed effects.

In 1997 and 1998, two papers by Don Colladay and Alan Kostelecký gave birth to the minimal SME in flat spacetime. This provided a framework for Lorentz violation across the spectrum of standard-model particles, and provided information about types of signals for potential new experimental searches.

In 2004, the leading Lorentz-breaking terms in curved spacetimes were published, thereby completing the picture for the minimal SME. In 1999, Sidney Coleman and Sheldon Glashow presented a special isotropic limit of the SME. Higher-order Lorentz violating terms have been studied in various contexts, including electrodynamics.

== Lorentz transformations: observer vs. particle ==
The distinction between particle and observer transformations is essential to understanding Lorentz violation in physics because Lorentz violation implies a measurable difference between two systems differing only by a particle Lorentz transformation.

In special relativity, observer Lorentz transformations relate measurements made in reference frames with differing velocities and orientations. The coordinates in the one system are related to those in the other by an observer Lorentz transformation—a rotation, a boost, or a combination of both. Each observer will agree on the laws of physics, since this transformation is simply a change of coordinates. On the other hand, identical experiments can be rotated or boosted relative to each other, while being studied by the same inertial observer. These transformations are called particle transformations, because the matter and fields of the experiment are physically transformed into the new configuration.

In a conventional vacuum, observer and particle transformations can be related to each other in a simple way—basically one is the inverse of the other. This apparent equivalence is often expressed using the terminology of active and passive transformations. The equivalence fails in Lorentz-violating theories, however, because fixed background fields are the source of the symmetry breaking. These background fields are tensor-like quantities, creating preferred directions and boost-dependent effects. The fields extend over all space and time, and are essentially frozen. When an experiment sensitive to one of the background fields is rotated or boosted, i.e. particle transformed, the background fields remain unchanged, and measurable effects are possible. Observer Lorentz symmetry is expected for all theories, including Lorentz violating ones, since a change in the coordinates cannot affect the physics. This invariance is implemented in field theories by writing a scalar lagrangian, with properly contracted spacetime indices. Particle Lorentz breaking enters if the theory includes fixed SME background fields filling the universe.

== Building the SME ==
The SME can be expressed as a Lagrangian with various terms. Each Lorentz-violating term is an observer scalar constructed by contracting standard field operators with controlling coefficients called coefficients for Lorentz violation. These are not parameters, but rather predictions of the theory, since they can in principle be measured by appropriate experiments. The coefficients are expected to be small because of the Planck-scale suppression, so perturbative methods are appropriate. In some cases, other suppression mechanisms could mask large Lorentz violations. For instance, large violations that may exist in gravity could have gone undetected so far because of couplings with weak gravitational fields. Stability and causality of the theory have been studied in detail.

== Spontaneous Lorentz symmetry breaking ==
In field theory, there are two possible ways to implement the breaking of a symmetry: explicit and spontaneous. A key result in the formal theory of Lorentz violation, published by Kostelecký in 2004, is that explicit Lorentz violation leads to incompatibility of the Bianchi identities with the covariant conservation laws for the energy–momentum and spin-density tensors, whereas spontaneous Lorentz breaking evades this difficulty. This theorem requires that any breaking of Lorentz symmetry must be dynamical. Formal studies of the possible causes of the breakdown of Lorentz symmetry include investigations of the fate of the expected Nambu–Goldstone modes. Goldstone's theorem implies that the spontaneous breaking must be accompanied by massless bosons. These modes might be identified with the photon, the graviton, spin-dependent interactions, and spin-independent interactions.

== Experimental searches ==
The possible signals of Lorentz violation in any experiment can be calculated from the SME. It has therefore proven to be a remarkable tool in the search for Lorentz violation across the landscape of experimental physics. Up until the present, experimental results have taken the form of upper bounds on the SME coefficients. Since the results will be numerically different for different inertial reference frames, the standard frame adopted for reporting results is the Sun-centered frame. This frame is a practical and appropriate choice, since it is accessible and inertial on the time scale of hundreds of years.

Typical experiments seek couplings between the background fields and various particle properties such as spin, or propagation direction. One of the key signals of Lorentz violation arises because experiments on Earth are unavoidably rotating and revolving relative to the Sun-centered frame. These motions lead to both annual and sidereal variations of the measured coefficients for Lorentz violation. Since the translational motion of the Earth around the Sun is nonrelativistic, annual variations are typically suppressed by a factor 10^{−4}. This makes sidereal variations the leading time-dependent effect to look for in experimental data.

Measurements of SME coefficients have been done with experiments involving:

- birefringence and dispersion from cosmological sources
- clock-comparison measurements
- CMB polarization
- collider experiments
- electromagnetic resonant cavities
- equivalence principle
- gauge and Higgs particles
- high-energy astrophysical observations
- laboratory and gravimetric tests of gravity
- matter interferometry
- neutrino oscillations
- oscillations and decays of K, B, D mesons
- particle-antiparticle comparisons
- Post-newtonian gravity in the Solar System and beyond
- second- and third-generation particles
- space-based missions
- spectroscopy of hydrogen and antihydrogen
- spin-polarized matter.

All experimental results for SME coefficients are tabulated in the Data Tables for Lorentz and CPT Violation.

== See also ==
- Antimatter tests of Lorentz violation
- Lorentz-violating electrodynamics
- Lorentz-violating neutrino oscillations
- Bumblebee Models
- Tests of special relativity
- Test theories of special relativity
