= Lorentz-violating neutrino oscillations =

Quantum phenomenon

Lorentz-violating neutrino oscillation refers to the quantum phenomenon of neutrino oscillations described in a framework that allows the breakdown of Lorentz invariance. Today, neutrino oscillation or change of one type of neutrino into another is an experimentally verified fact; however, the details of the underlying theory responsible for these processes remain an open issue and an active field of study. The conventional model of neutrino oscillations assumes that neutrinos have mass, which provides a successful description of a wide variety of experiments; however, there are a few oscillation signals that cannot be accommodated within this model, which motivates the study of other descriptions. In a theory with Lorentz violation, neutrinos can oscillate with and without masses and many other novel effects described below appear. The generalization of the theory by incorporating Lorentz violation has shown to provide alternative scenarios to explain all the established experimental data through the construction of global models.

== Introduction ==
Conventional Lorentz-preserving descriptions of neutrinos explain the phenomenon of oscillations by endowing these particles with mass. However, if Lorentz violation occurs, oscillations could be due to other mechanisms. The general framework for Lorentz violation is called the Standard-Model Extension (SME). The neutrino sector of the SME provides a description of how Lorentz and CPT violation would affect neutrino propagation, interactions, and oscillations. This neutrino framework first appeared in 1997 as part of the general SME for Lorentz violation in particle physics, which is built from the operators of the Standard Model. An isotropic limit of the SME, including a discussion on Lorentz-violating neutrino oscillations, was presented in a 1999 publication. Full details of the general formalism for Lorentz and CPT symmetry in the neutrino sector appeared in a 2004 publication. This work presented the minimal SME (mSME) for the neutrino sector, which involves only renormalizable terms. The incorporation of operators of arbitrary dimension in the neutrino sector was presented in 2011.

The Lorentz-violating contributions to the Lagrangian are built as observer Lorentz scalars by contracting standard field operators with controlling quantities called coefficients for Lorentz violation. These coefficients, arising from the spontaneous breaking of Lorentz symmetry, lead to non-standard effects that could be observed in current experiments. Tests of Lorentz symmetry attempt to measure these coefficients. A nonzero result would indicate Lorentz violation.

The construction of the neutrino sector of the SME includes the Lorentz-invariant terms of the standard neutrino massive model, Lorentz-violating terms that are even under CPT, and ones that are odd under CPT. Since in field theory the breaking of CPT symmetry is accompanied by the breaking of Lorentz symmetry, the CPT-breaking terms are necessarily Lorentz breaking. It is reasonable to expect that Lorentz and CPT violation are suppressed at the Planck scale, so the coefficients for Lorentz violation are likely to be small. The interferometric nature of neutrino oscillation experiments, and also of neutral-meson systems, gives them exceptional sensitivity to such tiny effects. This holds promise for oscillation-based experiments to probe new physics and access regions of the SME coefficient space that are still untested.

== General predictions ==
Current experimental results indicate that neutrinos do indeed oscillate. These oscillations have a variety of possible implications, including the existence of neutrino masses, and the presence of several types of Lorentz violation. In the following, each category of Lorentz breaking is outlined.

=== Spectral anomalies ===
In the standard Lorentz-invariant description of massive-neutrinos, the oscillation phase is proportional to the baseline L and inversely proportional to the neutrino energy E. The mSME introduces dimension-three operators that lead to oscillation phases with no energy dependence. It also introduces dimension-four operators generating oscillation phases proportional to the energy. Standard oscillation amplitudes are controlled by three mixing angles and one phase, all of which are constant. In the SME framework, Lorentz violation can lead to energy-dependent mixing parameters. When the whole SME is considered and nonrenormalizable terms in the theory are not neglected, the energy dependence of the effective hamiltonian takes the form of an infinite series in powers of neutrino energy. The fast growth of elements in the hamiltonian could produce oscillation signals in short-baseline experiment, as in the puma model.

The unconventional energy dependence in the theory leads to other novel effects, including corrections to the dispersion relations that would make neutrinos move at velocities other than the speed of light. By this mechanism neutrinos could become faster-than-light particles. The most general form of the neutrino sector of the SME has been constructed by including operators of arbitrary dimension. In this formalism, the speed of propagation of neutrinos is obtained. Some of the interesting new features introduced by the violation of Lorentz invariance include dependence of this velocity on neutrino energy and direction of propagation. Moreover, different neutrino flavors could also have different speeds.

=== L − E conflicts ===
The L − E conflicts refer to null or positive oscillation signals for values of L and E that are not consistent with the Lorentz-invariant explanation. For example, KamLAND and SNO observations require a mass-squared difference $\Delta m^2_\odot\simeq8\times10^{-5}\,\mbox{eV}^2$ to be consistent with the Lorentz-invariant phase proportional to L/E. Similarly, Super-Kamiokande, K2K, and MINOS observations of atmospheric-neutrino oscillations require a mass-squared difference $\Delta m^2_\text{atm}\simeq2.5\times10^{-3}\,\mbox{eV}^2$. Any neutrino-oscillation experiment must be consistent with either of these two mass-squared differences for Lorentz invariance to hold. To date, this is the only class of signal for which there is positive evidence. The LSND experiment observed oscillations leading to a mass-squared difference that is inconsistent with results from solar- and atmospheric-neutrino observations. The oscillation phase requires $\Delta m^2_\text{LSND}\simeq 1\,\mbox{eV}^2$. This anomaly can be understood in the presence of Lorentz violation.

=== Periodic variations ===
Laboratory experiments follow complicated trajectories as the Earth rotates on its axis and revolves around the Sun. Since the fixed SME background fields are coupled with the particle fields, periodic variations associated with these motions would be one of the signatures of Lorentz violation.

There are two categories of periodic variations:

1. Sidereal variations: As the Earth rotates, the source and detector for any neutrino experiment will rotate along with it at a sidereal frequency of $\omega_\oplus\sim2\pi/23\,\mbox{h}\, 56 \,\mbox{min}$. Since the 3-momentum of the neutrino beam is coupled to the SME background fields, this can lead to sidereal variations in the observed oscillation probability data. Sidereal variations are among the most commonly sought signals in Lorentz tests in other sectors of the SME.
2. Annual variations: Variations with a period of one year can arise due to the motion of the Earth around the Sun. The mechanism is the same as for sidereal variations, arising because the particle fields couple to the fixed SME background fields. These effects, however, are challenging to resolve because they require the experiment to provide data for a comparable length of time. There are also boost effects that arise because the earth moves around the Sun at more than 30 kilometers per second. However, this is one ten thousandth of the speed of light, and means the boost effects are suppressed by four orders of magnitude relative to purely rotational effects.

=== Compass asymmetries ===
The breaking of rotation invariance can also lead to time-independent signals arising in the form of directional asymmetries at the location of the detector. This type of signal can cause differences in observed neutrino properties for neutrinos originating from different directions.

=== Neutrino-antineutrino mixing ===
Some of the mSME coefficients lead to mixing between neutrinos and antineutrinos. These processes violate lepton number conservation, but can readily be accommodated in the Lorentz-breaking SME framework. The breaking of invariance under rotations leads to the non-conservation of angular momentum, which allows a spin flip of the propagating neutrino that can oscillate into an antineutrino. Because of the loss of rotational symmetry, coefficients responsible for this type of mixing always introduce direction dependence.

=== Classic CPT tests ===
Since CPT violation implies Lorentz violation, traditional tests of CPT symmetry can also be used to search for deviations from Lorentz invariance. This test seeks evidence of $P_{\nu_a\rightarrow\nu_b}\neq P_{\bar\nu_b\rightarrow\bar\nu_a}$. Some subtle features arise. For example, although CPT invariance implies $P_{\nu_a\rightarrow\nu_b}=P_{\bar\nu_b\rightarrow\bar\nu_a}$, this relation can be satisfied even in the presence of CPT violation.

== Global models of neutrino oscillations with Lorentz violation ==
Global models are descriptions of neutrino oscillations that are consistent with all the established experimental data: solar, reactor, accelerator, and atmospheric neutrinos. The general SME theory of Lorentz-violating neutrinos has shown to be very successful as an alternative description of all observed neutrino data. These global models are based on the SME and exhibit some of the key signals of Lorentz violation described in the previous section.

=== Bicycle model ===
The first phenomenological model using Lorentz-violating neutrinos was proposed by Kostelecky and Mewes in a 2004 paper. This so-called bicycle model exhibits direction dependence and only two parameters (two non-zero SME coefficients), instead of the six of the conventional massive model. One of the main characteristics of this model is that neutrinos are assumed to be massless. This simple model is compatible with solar, atmospheric, and long-baseline neutrino oscillation data. A novel feature of the bicycle model occurs at high energies, where the two SME coefficients combine to create a direction-dependent pseudomass. This leads to maximal mixing and an oscillation phase proportional to L/E, as in the massive case.

=== Generalized bicycle model ===
The bicycle model is an example of a very simple and realistic model that can accommodate most of the observed data using massless neutrinos in the presence of Lorentz violation. In 2007, Barger, Marfatia, and Whisnant constructed a more general version of this model by including more parameters. In this paper, it is shown that a combined analysis of solar, reactor, and long-baseline experiments excluded the bicycle model and its generalization. Despite this, the bicycle served as starting point for more elaborate models.

=== Tandem model ===
The tandem model is an extended version of the bicycle presented in 2006 by Katori, Kostelecky, and Tayloe. It is a hybrid model that includes Lorentz violation and also mass terms for a subset of neutrino flavors. It attempts to construct a realistic model by applying a number of desirable criteria. In particular, acceptable models for neutrino violation should:

1. be based on quantum field theory,
2. involve only renormalizable terms,
3. offer an acceptable description of the basic features of neutrino-oscillation data,
4. have a mass scale $\lesssim0.1\,\text{eV}$ for seesaw compatibility,
5. involve fewer parameters than the four used in the standard picture,
6. have coefficients for Lorentz violation consistent with a Planck-scale suppression $\lesssim10^{-17}$, and
7. accommodate the LSND signal.

All these criteria are satisfied by the tandem model, which looks like a simple extension of the bicycle. Nevertheless, it involves isotropic coefficients only, which means that there is no direction dependence. The extra term is a massive term that reproduces the L/E phase at low energies observed by KamLAND. It turns out that the tandem model is consistent with atmospheric, solar, reactor, and short-baseline data, including LSND. Besides the consistency with all experimental data, the most remarkable feature of this model is the prediction of a low-energy excess in MiniBooNE. When the tandem is applied to short-baseline accelerator experiments, it is consistent with the KARMEN null result, due to the very short baseline. For MiniBooNE, the tandem model predicted an oscillation signal at low energy that drops off very quickly. The MiniBooNE results, released a year after the tandem model was published, did indeed show an unexplained excess at low energies. This excess cannot be understood within the standard massive-neutrino model, and the tandem remains one of the best candidates for its explanation.

=== Puma model ===
The puma model was proposed by Diaz and Kostelecky in 2010 as a three-parameter model that exhibits consistency with all the established neutrino data (accelerator, atmospheric, reactor, and solar) and naturally describes the anomalous low-energy excess observed in MiniBooNE that is inconsistent with the conventional massive model. This is a hybrid model that includes Lorentz violation and neutrino masses. One of the main differences between this model and the bicycle and tandem models described above is the incorporation of nonrenormalizable terms in the theory, which lead to powers of the energy greater than one. Nonetheless, all these models share the characteristic of having a mixed energy dependence that leads to energy-dependent mixing angles, a feature absent in the conventional massive model. At low energies, the mass term dominates and the mixing takes the tribimaximal form, a widely used matrix postulated to describe neutrino mixing. This mixing added to the 1/E dependence of the mass term guarantees agreement with solar and KamLAND data. At high energies, Lorentz-violating contributions take over making the contribution of neutrino masses negligible. A seesaw mechanism is triggered, similar to that in the bicycle model, making one of the eigenvalues proportional to 1/E, which usually come with neutrino masses. This feature lets the model mimic the effects of a mass term at high energies despite the fact that there are only non-negative powers of the energy. The energy dependence of the Lorentz-violating terms produce maximal $\nu_\mu\leftrightarrow\nu_\tau$ mixing, which makes the model consistent with atmospheric and accelerator data. The oscillation signal in MiniBooNE appears because the oscillation phase responsible for the oscillation channel $\nu_\mu\rightarrow\nu_e$ grows rapidly with energy and the oscillation amplitude is large only for energies below 500 MeV. The combination of these two effects produces an oscillation signal in MiniBooNE at low energies, in agreement with the data. Additionally, since the model includes a term associated to a CPT-odd Lorentz-violating operator, different probabilities appear for neutrinos and antineutrinos. Moreover, since the amplitude for $\nu_\mu\rightarrow\nu_e$ decreases for energies above 500 MeV, long-baseline experiments searching for nonzero $\theta_{13}$ should measure different values depending on the energy; more precisely, the MINOS experiment should measure a value smaller than the T2K experiment according to the puma model, which agrees with current measurements.

=== Isotropic bicycle model ===
In 2011, Barger, Liao, Marfatia, and Whisnant studied general bicycle-type models (without neutrino masses) that can be constructed using the minimal SME that are isotropic (direction independent). Results show that long-baseline accelerator and atmospheric data can be described by these models in virtue of the Lorentz-violating seesaw mechanism; nevertheless, there is a tension between solar and KamLAND data. Given this incompatibility, the authors concluded that renormalizable models with massless neutrinos are excluded by the data.

== Mathematical theory ==
From a general model-independent point of view, neutrinos oscillate because the effective hamiltonian describing their propagation is not diagonal in flavor space and has a non-degenerate spectrum, in other words, the eigenstates of the hamiltonian are linear superpositions of the flavor eigenstates of the weak interaction and there are at least two different eigenvalues. If we find a transformation $U_{a'a}$ that puts the effective hamiltonian in flavor basis (h_{eff})_{ab} in the diagonal form

$$E_{a'b'}=\mathrm{diag}(\lambda_1,\lambda_2,\lambda_3)$$

(where the indices a, b = e, μ, τ and a′, b′ =1, 2, 3 denote the flavor and diagonal basis, respectively), then we can write the oscillation probability from a flavor state $|\nu_b\rangle$ to $|\nu_a\rangle$ as

$$P_{\nu_b\rightarrow\nu_a}=\left|\left\langle \nu_a|\nu_b(L)\right\rangle \right|^{2}=\left|\sum_{a'}U_{a'a}^{*}U_{a'b}\, e^{ -i \lambda_{a'} L }\right|^{2},$$

where $\lambda_{a'}\frac{}{}$ are the eigenvalues. For the conventional massive model $\lambda_{a'}=m^2_{a'}/2E$.

In the SME formalism, the neutrino sector is described by a 6-component vector with three active left-handed neutrinos and three right-handed antineutrinos. The effective Lorentz-violating Hamiltonian is a 6 × 6 matrix that takes the explicit form

$$h_\text{eff}=\begin{pmatrix} |\vec p|&0\\\\0&|\vec p|\end{pmatrix}
+\frac{1}{2|\vec p|}\begin{pmatrix} (\tilde m^2)&0\\\\0&(\tilde m^2)^*\end{pmatrix}
+\frac{1}{|\vec p|}\begin{pmatrix}
\widehat{a}_\text{eff}-\widehat{c}_\text{eff} &
-\widehat{g}_\text{eff}+\widehat{H}_\text{eff} \\\\
-\widehat{g}_\text{eff}^\dagger+\widehat{H}_\text{eff}^\dagger &
-\widehat{a}_\text{eff}^T-\widehat{c}_\text{eff}^T
\end{pmatrix} ,$$

where flavor indices have been suppressed for simplicity. The widehat on the elements of the last term indicates that these effective coefficients for Lorentz violation are associated to operators of arbitrary dimension. These elements are in general functions of the energy, neutrino direction of propagation, and coefficients for Lorentz violation. Each block corresponds to a 3 × 3 matrix. The 3 × 3 diagonal blocks describe neutrino–neutrino and antineutrino–antineutrino mixing, respectively. The 3 × 3 off-diagonal blocks lead to neutrino–antineutrino oscillations. This hamiltonian contains the information of propagation and oscillations of neutrinos. In particular, the speed of propagation relevant for time-of-flight measurements can be written

$$v^\text{of}=1 - \frac{|m_l|^2}{2|\vec p|^2}
+ \sum_{djm} (d-3) |\vec p|^{d-4} \, Y_{jm}(\hat p) \big[(a_\text{of}^{(d)})_{jm}-(c_\text{of}^{(d)})_{jm}\big]
,$$

that corresponds to oscillation-free approximation of the hamiltonian above. In this expression the neutrino speed has been spherically decomposed by using the standard spherical harmonics. This expression shows how neutrino speed can depend on energy and direction of propagation. In general, this speed can also depend on neutrino flavor. The index d denotes the dimension of the operator that breaks Lorentz symmetry. The form of neutrino speed shows that faster-than-light neutrinos can naturally be described by the SME.

During the last decade, studies have mainly focused on the minimal sector of the general theory, in which case the hamiltonian above takes the explicit form

$$\begin{align}
(h_\text{eff})_{AB}&=E\begin{pmatrix} \delta_{ab}&0\\\\0&\delta_{\bar a\bar b}\end{pmatrix}
+\frac{1}{2E}\begin{pmatrix} (\tilde m^2)_{ab}&0\\\\0&(\tilde m^2)_{\bar a\bar b}^*\end{pmatrix} \\\\
&\quad+\frac{1}{E}\begin{pmatrix}[(a_L)^\alpha p_\alpha-(c_L)^{\alpha\beta} p_\alpha p_\beta]_{ab}&
-i\sqrt2p_\alpha(\epsilon_+)_\beta[(g^{\alpha\beta\gamma}p_\gamma-H^{\alpha\beta})]_{a\bar b}\\\\
i\sqrt2p_\alpha(\epsilon_+)_\beta^*[(g^{\alpha\beta\gamma}p_\gamma-H^{\alpha\beta})]_{\bar ab}^*&
[(a_R)^\alpha p_\alpha-(c_R)^{\alpha\beta} p_\alpha p_\beta]_{\bar a\bar b}\end{pmatrix} .
\end{align}$$

The indices of this effective Hamiltonian take the six values A, B = e, μ, τ, e̅, μ̅, τ̅, for neutrinos and antineutrinos. The lowercase indices indicate neutrinos (a, b = e, μ, τ), and the barred lowercase indices indicate antineutrinos (a̅, b̅ = e̅, μ̅, τ̅). Notice that the ultrarelativistic approximation $E\simeq|\vec p|$ has been used.

The first term is diagonal and can be removed because it does not contribute to oscillations; however, it can play an important role in the stability of the theory. The second term is the standard massive-neutrino Hamiltonian. The third term is the Lorentz-violating contribution. It involves four types of coefficients for Lorentz violation. The coefficients $(a_L)^\alpha_{ab}$ and $(c_L)^{\alpha\beta}_{ab}$ are of dimension one and zero, respectively. These coefficients are responsible for the mixing of left-handed neutrinos, leading to Lorentz-violating neutrino–neutrino oscillations. Similarly, the coefficients $(a_R)^\alpha_{\bar a\bar b}$ and $(c_R)^{\alpha\beta}_{\bar a\bar b}$ mix right-handed antineutrinos, leading to Lorentz-violating antineutrino–antineutrino oscillations. Notice that these coefficients are 3 × 3 matrices having both spacetime (Greek) and flavor indices (Roman). The off-diagonal block involves the dimension-zero coefficients, $g^{\alpha\beta\gamma}_{a\bar b}$, and the dimension-one coefficients, $H^{\alpha\beta}_{a\bar b}$. These lead to neutrino–antineutrino oscillations. All spacetime indices are properly contracted forming observer Lorentz scalars. The four-momentum shows explicitly that the direction of propagation couples to the mSME coefficients, generating the periodic variations and compass asymmetries described in the previous section. Finally, note that coefficients with an odd number of spacetime indices are contracted with operators that break CPT. It follows that the a- and g-type coefficients are CPT-odd. By similar reasoning, the c- and H-type coefficients are CPT-even.

== Applying the theory to experiments ==
=== Negligible-mass description ===
For most short baseline neutrino experiments, the ratio of experimental baseline to neutrino energy, L/E, is small, and neutrino masses can be neglected because they are not responsible for oscillations. In these cases, the possibility exists of attributing observed oscillations to Lorentz violation, even if the neutrinos are massive. This limit of the theory is sometimes called the short-baseline approximation. Caution is necessary in this point, because, in short-baseline experiments, masses can become relevant if the energies are sufficiently low.

An analysis of this limit, presenting experimentally accessible coefficients for Lorentz violation, first appeared in a 2004 publication. Neglecting neutrino masses, the neutrino Hamiltonian becomes

$$(h_\text{eff})_{ab}=\frac{1}{E}[(a_L)^\alpha p_\alpha-(c_L)^{\alpha\beta} p_\alpha p_\beta]_{ab}.$$

In appropriate cases, the oscillation amplitude can be expanded in the form

$$S(L)=e^{-ih_\text{eff}L}\simeq 1-ih_\text{eff}L-\frac{1}{2}h^2_\text{eff}L^2+\cdots.$$

This approximation is valid if the baseline L is short compared to the oscillation length given by h_{eff}. Since h_{eff} varies with energy, the term short baseline really depends on both L and E. At leading order, the oscillation probability becomes

$$P_{\nu_b\rightarrow\nu_a}\simeq L^2|(h_\text{eff})_{ab}|^2,\quad a\neq b.$$

Remarkably, this mSME framework for short-baseline neutrino experiments, when applied to the LSND anomaly, leads to values of order $10^{-19}\,\text{GeV}$ for $(a_L)^\alpha_{ab}$ and $10^{-17}$ for $(c_L)^{\alpha\beta}_{ab}$. These numbers are in the range of what one might expect from quantum-gravity effects. Data analysis has been performed using the LSND, MINOS, MiniBooNE, and IceCube experiments to set limits on the coefficients $(a_L)^\alpha_{ab}$ and $(c_L)^{\alpha\beta}_{ab}$. These results, along with experimental results in other sectors of the SME, are summarized in the Data Tables for Lorentz and CPT violation.

=== Perturbative Lorentz-violating description ===
For experiments where L/E is not small, neutrino masses dominate the oscillation effects. In these cases, Lorentz violation can be introduced as a perturbative effect in the form

$$h = h_0+\delta h ,$$

where h_{0} is the standard massive-neutrino Hamiltonian, and δh contains the Lorentz-breaking mSME terms. This limit of the general theory was introduced in a 2009 publication, and includes both neutrinos and antineutrinos in the 6 × 6 Hamiltonian formalism (1). In this work, the oscillation probability takes the form

$$P_{\nu_b\rightarrow\nu_a}=P_{\nu_b\rightarrow\nu_a}^{(0)}+P_{\nu_b\rightarrow\nu_a}^{(1)}+P_{\nu_b\rightarrow\nu_a}^{(2)}+\cdots,$$

where $P_{\nu_b\rightarrow\nu_a}^{(0)}$ is the standard expression. One of the results is that, at leading order, neutrino and antineutrino oscillations are decoupled from one another. This means neutrino–antineutrino oscillations are a second-order effect.

In the two-flavor limit, the first-order correction introduced by Lorentz violation to atmospheric neutrinos takes the simple form

$$P_{\nu_\mu\rightarrow\nu_\tau}^{(1)}=-Re(\delta h_{\mu\tau})L\,\sin{(\Delta m^2_{32}L/2E)}.$$

This expression shows how the baseline of the experiment can enhance the effects of the mSME coefficients in δh.

This perturbative framework can be applied to most of the long-baseline experiments. It is also applicable in some short-baseline experiments with low-energy neutrinos. An analysis has been done in the case of several long-baseline experiments (DUSEL, ICARUS, K2K, MINOS, NOvA, OPERA, T2K, and T2KK), showing high sensitivities to the coefficients for Lorentz violation. Data analysis has been performed using the far detector of the MINOS experiment to set limits on the coefficients $(a_L)^\alpha_{ab}$ and $(c_L)^{\alpha\beta}_{ab}$. These results are summarized in the Data Tables for Lorentz and CPT violation.

== See also ==
- Standard-Model Extension
- Lorentz-violating electrodynamics
- Antimatter Tests of Lorentz Violation
- Bumblebee models
- Neutrino oscillation
- Tests of special relativity
- Test theories of special relativity
