= Antimatter tests of Lorentz violation =

Experiments testing the fundamental assumptions of physics

High-precision experiments could reveal small previously unseen differences between the behavior of matter and antimatter. This prospect is appealing to physicists because it may show that nature is not Lorentz symmetric.

== Introduction ==
Ordinary matter is made up of protons, electrons, and neutrons. The quantum behavior of these particles can be predicted with excellent accuracy using the Dirac equation, named after P.A.M. Dirac. One of the triumphs of the Dirac equation is its prediction of the existence of antimatter particles. Antiprotons, positrons, and antineutrons are now well understood, and can be created and studied in experiments.

High-precision experiments have been unable to detect any difference between the masses of particles and those of the corresponding antiparticles. They also have been unable to detect any difference between the magnitudes of the charges, or between the lifetimes, of particles and antiparticles. These mass, charge, and lifetime symmetries are required in a Lorentz and CPT symmetric universe, but are only a small number of the properties that need to match if the universe is Lorentz and CPT symmetric.

The Standard-Model Extension (SME), a comprehensive theoretical framework for Lorentz and CPT violation, makes specific predictions about how particles and antiparticles would behave differently in a universe that is very close to, but not exactly, Lorentz symmetric. In loose terms, the SME can be visualized as being constructed from fixed background fields that interact weakly, but differently, with particles and antiparticles.

The behavioral differences between matter and antimatter are specific to each individual experiment. Factors that determine the behavior include the particle species involved, the electromagnetic, gravitational, and nuclear fields controlling the system. Furthermore, for any Earth-bound experiment, the rotational and orbital motion of the Earth is important, leading to sidereal and seasonal signals. For experiments conducted in space, the orbital motion of the craft is an important factor in determining the signals of Lorentz violation that might arise. To harness the predictive power of the SME in any specific system, a calculation has to be performed so that all these factors can be accounted for. These calculations are facilitated by the reasonable assumption that Lorentz violations, if they exist, are small. This makes it possible to use perturbation theory to obtain results that would otherwise be extremely difficult to find.

The SME generates a modified Dirac equation that breaks Lorentz symmetry for some types of particle motions, but not others. It therefore holds important information about how Lorentz violations might have been hidden in past experiments, or might be revealed in future ones.

== Lorentz violation tests with Penning Traps ==
A Penning trap is a research apparatus capable of trapping individual charged particles and their antimatter counterparts. The trapping mechanism is a strong magnetic field that keeps the particles near a central axis, and an electric field that turns the particles around when they stray too far along the axis. The motional frequencies of the trapped particle can be monitored and measured with astonishing precision. One of these frequencies is the anomaly frequency, which has played an important role in the measurement of the gyromagnetic ratio of the electron (see gyromagnetic ratio § gyromagnetic ratio for an isolated electron).

The first calculations of SME effects in Penning traps were published in 1997 and 1998. They showed that, in identical Penning traps, if the anomaly frequency of an electron was increased, then the anomaly frequency of a positron would be decreased. The size of the increase or decrease in the frequency would be a measure of the strength of one of the SME background fields. More specifically, it is a measure of the component of the background field along the direction of the axial magnetic field.

In tests of Lorentz symmetry, the noninertial nature of the laboratory due to the rotational and orbital motion of the Earth has to be taken into account. Each Penning-trap measurement is the projection of the background SME fields along the axis of the experimental magnetic field at the time of the experiment. This is further complicated if the experiment takes hours, days, or longer to perform.

One approach is to seek instantaneous differences, by comparing anomaly frequencies for a particle and an antiparticle measured at the same time on different days. Another approach is to seek sidereal variations, by continuously monitoring the anomaly frequency for just one species of particle over an extended time. Each offers different challenges. For example, instantaneous comparisons require the electric field in the trap to be precisely reversed, while sidereal tests are limited by the stability of the magnetic field.

An experiment conducted by the physicist Gerald Gabrielse of Harvard University involved two particles confined in a Penning trap. The idea was to compare a proton and an antiproton, but to overcome the technicalities of having opposite charges, a negatively charged hydrogen ion was used in place of the proton. The ion, two electrons bound electrostatically with a proton, and the antiproton have the same charge and can therefore be simultaneously trapped. This design allows for quick interchange of the proton and the antiproton and so an instantaneous-type Lorentz test can be performed. The cyclotron frequencies of the two trapped particles were about 90 MHz, and the apparatus was capable of resolving differences in these of about 1.0 Hz. The absence of Lorentz violating effects of this type placed a limit on combinations of $c$-type SME coefficients that had not been accessed in other experiments. The results appeared in Physical Review Letters in 1999.

The Penning-trap group at the University of Washington, headed by the Nobel Laureate Hans Dehmelt, conducted a search for sidereal variations in the anomaly frequency of a trapped electron. The results were extracted from an experiment that ran for several weeks, and the analysis required splitting the data into "bins" according to the orientation of the apparatus in the inertial reference frame of the Sun. At a resolution of 0.20 Hz, they were unable to discern any sidereal variations in the anomaly frequency, which runs around 185,000,000 Hz. Translating this into an upper bound on the relevant SME background field, places a bound of about 10^{−24} GeV on a $b$-type electron coefficient. This work was published in Physical Review Letters in 1999.

Another experimental result from the Dehmelt group involved a comparison of the instantaneous type. Using data from a single trapped electron and a single trapped positron, they again found no difference between the two anomaly frequencies at a resolution of about 0.2 Hz. This result placed a bound on a simpler combination of $b$-type coefficients at a level of about 10^{−24} GeV. In addition to being a limit on Lorentz violation, this also limits the CPT violation. This result appeared in Physical Review Letters in 1999.

== Lorentz violation in antihydrogen ==
The antihydrogen atom is the antimatter counterpart of the hydrogen atom. It has a negatively charged antiproton at the nucleus that attracts a positively charged positron orbiting around it.

The spectral lines of hydrogen have frequencies determined by the energy differences between the quantum-mechanical orbital states of the electron. These lines have been studied in thousands of spectroscopic experiments and are understood in great detail. The quantum mechanics of the positron orbiting an antiproton in the antihydrogen atom is expected to be very similar to that of the hydrogen atom. In fact, conventional physics predicts that the spectrum of antihydrogen is identical to that of regular hydrogen.

In the presence of the background fields of the SME, the spectra of hydrogen and antihydrogen are expected to show tiny differences in some lines, and no differences in others. Calculations of these SME effects in antihydrogen and hydrogen were published in Physical Review Letters in 1999. One of the main results found is that hyperfine transitions are sensitive to Lorentz breaking effects.

Several experimental groups at CERN are working on producing antihydrogen: AEGIS, ALPHA, ASACUSA, ATRAP, and GBAR.

Creating trapped antihydrogen in sufficient quantities to do spectroscopy is an enormous experimental challenge. Signatures of Lorentz violation are similar to those expected in Penning traps. There would be sidereal effects causing variations in the spectral frequencies as the experimental laboratory turns with the Earth. There would also be the possibility of finding instantaneous Lorentz breaking signals when antihydrogen spectra are compared directly with conventional hydrogen spectra

In October 2017, the BASE experiment at CERN reported a measurement of the antiproton magnetic moment to a precision of 1.5 parts per billion. It is consistent with the most precise measurement of the proton magnetic moment (also made by BASE in 2014), which supports the hypothesis of CPT symmetry. This measurement represents the first time that a property of antimatter is known more precisely than the equivalent property in matter.

== Lorentz violation with muons ==
The muon and its positively charged antiparticle have been used to perform tests of Lorentz symmetry. Since the lifetime of the muon is only a few microseconds, the experiments are quite different from ones with electrons and positrons. Calculations for muon experiments aimed at probing Lorentz violation in the SME were first published in the year 2000.

In the year 2001, Hughes and collaborators published their results from a search for sidereal signals in the spectrum of muonium, an atom consisting of an electron bound to an antimuon, which has a positive charge. Their data, taken over a two-year period, showed no evidence for Lorentz violation. This placed a stringent constraint on a combination of $b$-type coefficients in the SME, published in Physical Review Letters.

In 2008, the Muon $g-2$ Collaboration at the Brookhaven National Laboratory published results after searching for signals of Lorentz violation with muons and antimuons. In one type of analysis, they compared the anomaly frequencies for the muon and its antiparticle. In another, they looked for sidereal variations by allocating their data into one-hour "bins" according to the orientation of the Earth relative to the Sun-centered inertial reference frame. Their results, published in Physical Review Letters in 2008, show no signatures of Lorentz violation at the resolution of the Brookhaven experiment.

Experimental results in all sectors of the SME are summarized in the Data Tables for Lorentz and CPT violation.

== See also ==
- AEGIS Experiment
- ALPHA Experiment
- ASACUSA Experiment
- ATRAP Experiment
- Lorentz-violating electrodynamics
- Lorentz-violating neutrino oscillations
- Standard-Model Extension
- Tests of special relativity
- Test theories of special relativity
