= Test theories of special relativity =

Mathematical framework to verify special relativity

Test theories of special relativity give a mathematical framework for analyzing results of experiments to verify special relativity.

An experiment to test the theory of relativity cannot assume the theory is true, and therefore needs some other framework of assumptions that are wider than those of relativity. For example, a test theory may have a different postulate about light concerning one-way speed of light vs. two-way speed of light, it may have a preferred frame of reference, and may violate Lorentz invariance in many different ways. Test theories predicting different experimental results from Einstein's special relativity, are Robertson's test theory (1949), and the Mansouri–Sexl theory (1977) which is equivalent to Robertson's theory. Another, more extensive model is the Standard-Model Extension, which also includes the Standard Model and general relativity.

== Robertson–Mansouri–Sexl framework ==
=== Basic principles ===
Howard Percy Robertson (1949) extended the Lorentz transformation by adding additional parameters. He assumed a preferred frame of reference, in which the two-way speed of light, i.e. the average speed from source to observer and back, is isotropic, while it is anisotropic in relatively moving frames due to the parameters employed. In addition, Robertson used the Poincaré–Einstein synchronization in all frames, making the one-way speed of light isotropic in all of them.

A similar model was introduced by Reza Mansouri and Roman Ulrich Sexl (1977). Contrary to Robertson, Mansouri–Sexl not only added additional parameters to the Lorentz transformation, but also discussed different synchronization schemes. The Poincaré–Einstein synchronization is only used in the preferred frame, while in relatively moving frames they used "external synchronization", i.e., the clock indications of the preferred frame are employed in those frames. Therefore, not only the two-way speed of light but also the one-way speed is anisotropic in moving frames.

Since the two-way speed of light in moving frames is anisotropic in both models, and only this speed is measurable without synchronization scheme in experimental tests, the models are experimentally equivalent and summarized as the "Robertson–Mansouri–Sexl test theory" (RMS). On the other hand, in special relativity the two-way speed of light is isotropic, therefore RMS gives different experimental predictions than special relativity. By evaluating the RMS parameters, this theory serves as a framework for assessing possible violations of Lorentz invariance.

=== Theory ===
In the following, the notation of Mansouri–Sexl is used. They chose the coefficients a, b, d, e of the following transformation between reference frames:

$$t = a T + e x \,$$
$$x = b (X - v T) \,$$
$$y = d Y \,$$
$$z = d Z \,$$

where T, X, Y, Z are the Cartesian coordinates measured in a postulated preferred frame (in which the speed of light c is isotropic), and t, x, y, z are the coordinates measured in a frame moving in the +X direction (with the same origin and parallel axes) at speed v relative to the preferred frame. And therefore $1/a(v)$ is the factor by which the interval between ticks of a clock increases when it moves (time dilation) and $1/b(v)$ is factor by which the length of a measuring rod is shortened when it moves (length contraction). If $1/a(v) = b(v) = 1/\sqrt{1 - v^2/c^2} \,,$ and $d(v) = 1 \,,$ and $e(v) = -v/c^2 \,,$ then the Lorentz transformation follows. The purpose of the test theory is to allow a(v) and b(v) to be measured by experiment, and to see how close the experimental values come to the values predicted by special relativity. (Notice that Newtonian physics, which has been conclusively excluded by experiment, results from $a(v) = b(v) = d(v) = 1, \text{ and } e(v) = 0 \,.$)

The value of e(v) depends only on the choice of clock synchronization and cannot be determined by experiment. Mansouri–Sexl discussed the following synchronization schemes:

- Internal clock synchronization like the Poincaré–Einstein synchronization by using light signals, or synchronization by slow clock transport. Those synchronization schemes are in general not equivalent, except the case when a(v) and b(v) have their exact relativistic value.
- External clock synchronization by choosing a "preferred" reference frame (like the CMB) and using the clocks of this frame to synchronize the clocks in all other frames ("absolute" synchronization).

By giving the effects of time dilation and length contraction the exact relativistic value, this test theory is experimentally equivalent to special relativity, independent of the chosen synchronization. So Mansouri and Sexl spoke about the "remarkable result that a theory maintaining absolute simultaneity is equivalent to special relativity." They also noticed the similarity between this test theory and Lorentz ether theory of Hendrik Lorentz, Joseph Larmor and Henri Poincaré. Though Mansouri, Sexl, and the overwhelming majority of physicists prefer special relativity over such an aether theory, because the latter "destroys the internal symmetry of a physical theory".

=== Experiments with RMS ===
RMS is currently used in the evaluation process of many modern tests of Lorentz invariance. To second order in v/c, the parameters of the RMS framework have the following form:

$a(v) \sim 1 + \alpha v^{2}/c^2 \,$, time dilation
$b(v) \sim 1 + \beta v^{2}/c^2 \,$, length in the direction of motion
$d(v) \sim 1 + \delta v^{2}/c^2 \,$, length perpendicular to the direction of motion

Deviations from the two-way (round-trip) speed of light are given by:

$$\frac{c}{c'}\sim1+\left(\beta-\delta-\frac{1}{2}\right)\frac{v^{2}}{c^{2}}\sin^{2}\theta+(\alpha-\beta+1)\frac{v^{2}}{c^{2}}$$

where $c\,$ is the speed of light in the preferred frame, and $c'\,$ is the speed of light measured in the moving frame at an angle $\theta\,$ from the direction in which the frame is moving. To verify that special relativity is correct, the expected values of the parameters are $\alpha=-\tfrac{1}{2},\ \beta=\tfrac{1}{2},\ \delta=0$, and thus $c/c'=1\,$.

The fundamental experiments to test those parameters, still repeated with increased accuracy, are:

- Michelson–Morley experiment, testing the direction dependence of the speed of light with respect to a preferred frame. Precision in 2009: $\left(\beta-\delta-\tfrac{1}{2}\right)=(4\pm8)\times10^{-12}\,$
- Kennedy–Thorndike experiment, testing the dependence of the speed of light on the velocity of the apparatus with respect to a preferred frame. Precision in 2010: $(\alpha-\beta+1)=-4.8(3.7)\times10^{-8}\,$
- Ives–Stilwell experiment, testing the relativistic Doppler effect, and thus the relativistic time dilation. Precision in 2007: $\left|\alpha+\tfrac{1}{2}\right|\leq8.4\times10^{-8}\,$

The combination of those three experiments, together with the Poincaré–Einstein convention to synchronize the clocks in all inertial frames, is necessary to obtain the complete Lorentz transformation. Michelson–Morley only tested the combination between β and δ, while Kennedy–Thorndike tested the combination between α and β. To obtain the individual values, it's necessary to measure one of these quantities directly. This was achieved by Ives–Stilwell who measured α. So β can be determined using Kennedy–Thorndike, and subsequently δ using Michelson–Morley.

In addition to those second order tests, Mansouri and Sexl described some experiments measuring first order effects in v/c (such as Rømer's determination of the speed of light) as being "measurements of the one-way speed of light". These are interpreted by them as tests of the equivalence of internal synchronizations, i.e. between synchronization by slow clock transport and by light. They emphasize that the negative results of those tests are also consistent with aether theories in which moving bodies are subject to time dilation. However, even though many recent authors agree that measurements of the equivalence of those two clock-synchronization schemes are important tests of relativity, they don't speak of "one-way speed of light" in connection with such measurements anymore, because of their consistency with non-standard synchronizations. Those experiments are consistent with all synchronizations using anisotropic one-way speeds on the basis of isotropic two-way speed of light and two-way time dilation of moving bodies.

== Standard Model Extension ==
Another, more extensive, model is the Standard Model Extension (SME) by Alan Kostelecký and others. Contrary to the Robertson–Mansouri–Sexl (RMS) framework, which is kinematic in nature and restricted to special relativity, SME not only accounts for special relativity, but for dynamical effects of the Standard Model and general relativity as well. It investigates possible spontaneous breaking of both Lorentz invariance and CPT symmetry. RMS is fully included in SME, though the latter has a much larger group of parameters that can indicate any Lorentz or CPT violation.

For instance, a couple of SME parameters was tested in a 2007 study sensitive to 10^{−16}. It employed two simultaneous interferometers over a year's observation: Optical in Berlin at 52°31'N 13°20'E and microwave in Perth at 31°53'S 115°53E. A preferred background (leading to Lorentz Violation) could never be at rest relative to both of them. A large number of other tests has been carried out in recent years, such as the Hughes–Drever experiments. A list of derived and already measured SME-values was given by Kostelecký and Russell.

== See also ==
- Parameterized post-Newtonian formalism
