= Einstein synchronisation =

Convention for synchronising clocks

Einstein synchronisation (or Poincaré–Einstein synchronisation) is a convention for synchronising clocks at different places by means of signal exchanges. This synchronisation method was used by telegraphers in the middle 19th century, but was popularized by Henri Poincaré and Albert Einstein, who applied it to light signals and recognized its fundamental role in relativity theory. Its principal value is for clocks within a single inertial frame.

== Einstein ==
According to Albert Einstein's prescription from 1905, a light signal is sent at time $\tau_1$ from clock 1 to clock 2 and immediately back, e.g. by means of a mirror. Its arrival time back at clock 1 is $\tau_2$. This synchronisation convention sets clock 2 so that the time $\tau_3$ of signal reflection is defined to be
$$\tau_3 = \tau_1 + \tfrac{1}{2}(\tau_2 - \tau_1) = \tfrac{1}{2}(\tau_1 + \tau_2).$$

The same synchronisation is achieved by transporting a third clock from clock 1 to clock 2 "slowly" (that is, considering the limit as the transport velocity goes to zero). The literature discusses many other thought experiments for clock synchronisation giving the same result.

The problem is whether this synchronisation does really succeed in assigning a time label to any event in a consistent way. To that end one should find conditions under which:

1. clocks once synchronised remain synchronised,
  1. the synchronisation is reflexive, that is any clock is synchronised with itself (automatically satisfied),
  2. the synchronisation is symmetric, that is if clock A is synchronised with clock B then clock B is synchronised with clock A,
  3. the synchronisation is transitive, that is if clock A is synchronised with clock B and clock B is synchronised with clock C then clock A is synchronised with clock C.

If point (a) holds then it makes sense to say that clocks are synchronised. Given (a), if (b1)–(b3) hold then the synchronisation allows us to build a global time function t. The slices t = const. are called "simultaneity slices".

Einstein (1905) did not recognize the possibility of reducing (a) and (b1)–(b3) to easily verifiable physical properties of light propagation (see below). Instead he just wrote "We assume that this definition of synchronism is free from contradictions, and possible for any number of points; and that the following (that is b2–b3) relations are universally valid."

Max von Laue was the first to study the problem of the consistency of Einstein's synchronisation. Ludwik Silberstein presented a similar study although he left most of his claims as an exercise for the readers of his textbook on relativity. Max von Laue's arguments were taken up again by Hans Reichenbach, and found a final shape in a work by Alan Macdonald. The solution is that the Einstein synchronisation satisfies the previous requirements if and only if the following two conditions hold:

- No redshift: If from point A two flashes are emitted separated by a time interval Δt as recorded by a clock at A, then they reach B separated by the same time interval Δt as recorded by a clock at B.
- Reichenbach's round-trip condition: If a light beam is sent over the triangle ABC, starting from A and reflected by mirrors at B and C, then its arrival time back to A is independent of the direction followed (ABCA or ACBA).

Once clocks are synchronised one can measure the one-way speed of light. However, the previous conditions that guarantee the applicability of Einstein's synchronisation do not imply that the one-way light speed turns out to be the same all over the frame. Consider

- Laue–Weyl's round-trip condition: The time needed by a light beam to traverse a closed path of length L is L/c, where L is the length of the path and c is a constant independent of the path.

A theorem (whose origin can be traced back to von Laue and Hermann Weyl) states that Laue–Weyl's round trip condition holds if and only if the Einstein synchronisation can be applied consistently (i.e. (a) and (b1)–(b3) hold) and the one-way speed of light with respect to the so synchronised clocks is a constant all over the frame. The importance of Laue–Weyl's condition stands on the fact that the time there mentioned can be measured with only one clock; thus this condition does not rely on synchronisation conventions and can be experimentally checked. Indeed, it has been experimentally verified that the Laue–Weyl round-trip condition holds throughout an inertial frame.

Since it is meaningless to measure a one-way velocity prior to the synchronisation of distant clocks, experiments claiming a measure of the one-way speed of light can often be reinterpreted as verifying the Laue–Weyl's round-trip condition.

The Einstein synchronisation looks this natural only in inertial frames. One can easily forget that it is only a convention. In rotating frames, even in special relativity, the non-transitivity of Einstein synchronisation diminishes its usefulness. If clock 1 and clock 2 are not synchronised directly, but by using a chain of intermediate clocks, the synchronisation depends on the path chosen. Synchronisation around the circumference of a rotating disk gives a non-vanishing time difference that depends on the direction used. This is important in the Sagnac effect and the Ehrenfest paradox. The Global Positioning System accounts for this effect.

A substantive discussion of Einstein synchronisation's conventionalism is due to Hans Reichenbach. Most attempts to negate the conventionality of this synchronisation are considered refuted, with the notable exception of David Malament's argument, that it can be derived from demanding a symmetrical relation of causal connectability. Whether this settles the issue is disputed.

== History: Poincaré ==
Some features of the conventionality of synchronization were discussed by Henri Poincaré. In 1898 (in a philosophical paper) he argued that the assumption of light's uniform speed in all directions is useful to formulate physical laws in a simple way. He also showed that the definition of simultaneity of events at different places is only a convention. Based on those conventions, but within the framework of the now superseded aether theory, Poincaré in 1900 proposed the following convention for defining clock synchronisation: 2 observers A and B, which are moving in the aether, synchronise their clocks by means of optical signals. Because of the relativity principle they believe themselves to be at rest in the aether and assume that the speed of light is constant in all directions. Therefore, they have to consider only the transmission time of the signals and then crossing their observations to examine whether their clocks are synchronous.

Let us suppose that there are some observers placed at various points, and they synchronize their clocks using light signals. They attempt to adjust the measured transmission time of the signals, but they are not aware of their common motion, and consequently believe that the signals travel equally fast in both directions. They perform observations of crossing signals, one traveling from A to B, followed by another traveling from B to A. The local time $t'$ is the time indicated by the clocks which are so adjusted. If $V=\tfrac{1}{\sqrt{K_{0}}}$ is the speed of light, and $v$ is the speed of the Earth which we suppose is parallel to the $x$ axis, and in the positive direction, then we have: $t'=t-\tfrac{vx}{V^{2}}$.

In 1904 Poincaré illustrated the same procedure in the following way:

Imagine two observers who wish to adjust their timepieces by optical signals; they exchange signals, but as they know that the transmission of light is not instantaneous, they are careful to cross them. When station B perceives the signal from station A, its clock should not mark the same hour as that of station A at the moment of sending the signal, but this hour augmented by a constant representing the duration of the transmission. Suppose, for example, that station A sends its signal when its clock marks the hour 0, and that station B perceives it when its clock marks the hour $t$. The clocks are adjusted if the slowness equal to t represents the duration of the transmission, and to verify it, station B sends in its turn a signal when its clock marks 0; then station A should perceive it when its clock marks $t$. The timepieces are then adjusted. And in fact they mark the same hour at the same physical instant, but on the one condition, that the two stations are fixed. Otherwise the duration of the transmission will not be the same in the two senses, since the station A, for example, moves forward to meet the optical perturbation emanating from B, whereas the station B flees before the perturbation emanating from A. The watches adjusted in that way will not mark, therefore, the true time; they will mark what may be called the local time, so that one of them will be slow of the other.

== See also ==
- Relativity of simultaneity
- One-way speed of light

== Literature ==
- Darrigol, Olivier (2005), "The Genesis of the theory of relativity" (PDF), Séminaire Poincaré, vol. 1, pp. 1–22, Bibcode:2006eins.book....1D, doi:10.1007/3-7643-7436-5_1, ISBN 978-3-7643-7435-8
- D. Dieks, Becoming, relativity and locality, in The Ontology of Spacetime, online
- D. Dieks (ed.), The Ontology of Spacetime, Elsevier 2006, ISBN 0-444-52768-0
- D. Malament, 1977. "Causal Theories of Time and the Conventionality of Simultaniety," Noûs 11, 293–300.
- Galison, P. (2003), Einstein's Clocks, Poincaré's Maps: Empires of Time, New York: W.W. Norton, ISBN 0-393-32604-7
- A. Grünbaum. David Malament and the Conventionality of Simultaneity: A Reply, online
- S. Sarkar, J. Stachel, Did Malament Prove the Non-Conventionality of Simultaneity in the Special Theory of Relativity?, Philosophy of Science, Vol. 66, No. 2
- H. Reichenbach, Axiomatization of the theory of relativity, Berkeley University Press, 1969
- H. Reichenbach, The philosophy of space & time, Dover, New York, 1958
- H. P. Robertson, Postulate versus Observation in the Special Theory of Relativity, Reviews of Modern Physics, 1949
- R. Rynasiewicz, Definition, Convention, and Simultaneity: Malament's Result and Its Alleged Refutation by Sarkar and Stachel, Philosophy of Science, Vol. 68, No. 3, Supplement, online
- Hanoch Ben-Yami, Causality and Temporal Order in Special Relativity, British Jnl. for the Philosophy of Sci., Volume 57, Number 3, pp. 459–479, abstract online
