= Fock–Lorentz symmetry =

Symmetry principle in physics

Lorentz invariance follows from two independent postulates: the principle of relativity and the principle of constancy of the speed of light. Dropping the latter while keeping the former leads to a new invariance, known as Fock–Lorentz symmetry or the projective Lorentz transformation. The general study of such theories began with Fock, who was motivated by the search for the general symmetry group preserving relativity without assuming the constancy of c.

This invariance does not distinguish between inertial frames (and therefore satisfies the principle of relativity) but it allows for a varying speed of light in space, c; indeed it allows for a non-invariant c. According to Maxwell's equations, the speed of light satisfies

$$c = \frac{1}{\sqrt{\varepsilon _0 \mu_0}},$$

where ε_{0} and μ_{0} are the electric constant and the magnetic constant. If the speed of light depends upon the spacetime coordinates of the medium, say x, then

$$c(x) = \frac{1}{\sqrt{\chi(x)}},$$

where $\chi (x)$ represents the vacuum as a variable medium.

== See also ==
- Doubly special relativity
- Orders of magnitude (length)
- Planck scale
- Planck units
- Quantum gravity
- Planck epoch
