= Alan Kostelecky =

American physicist

Alan Kostelecký
- Education: Bristol University (B.Sc., 1977); Yale University (M.A., 1979; M.S., 1979; Ph.D., 1982)
- Known for: Lorentz symmetry breaking
- Awards: Gravity Research Foundation Award
- Scientific career
- Fields: Theoretical physics
- Workplaces: Indiana University, Bloomington
- Doctoral advisor: Samuel MacDowell

V. Alan Kostelecký is a theoretical physicist who is a distinguished professor of physics at Indiana University, Bloomington. He is noted for his work on Lorentz symmetry breaking in particle physics. He has been described as the world's leading authority on violations of space-time symmetry.

Kostelecký was a student at the International School of Geneva, Switzerland (1965-1973). Subsequently, he began as an undergraduate in biology, switched his degree to chemistry, and eventually switched for the last time to physics and obtained his undergraduate degree in science from Bristol University in 1977, and his Ph.D. in physics from Yale University in 1982. He has been a faculty member at the Indiana University in Bloomington since joining there in 1985.

In 1989, Kostelecký and his colleagues demonstrated the existence of an anisotropy in string theory models, and proposed a new version of the Standard Model of particle physics, called the Standard-Model Extension that catalogs the various ways in which space-time symmetry can be violated. The Standard-Model Extension has various "coefficients", which are parameters that can be adjusted to the requirements of the model. The theory has now become the benchmark for classic tests of relativity theory. Kostelecký's work hypothesizes possible asymmetries in the space-time at length scales of 10^{−35} m, that is, the Planck length scale. He has enlisted the help of several physicists from diverse areas such as astrophysics and particle physics to experimentally detect the presence of these asymmetries. Kostelecký, along with Stuart Samuel was the first to use the Bumblebee model in gravity as a simple model for investigating the consequences of spontaneous Lorentz violation.

Kostelecký has hosted a series of Meetings on CPT and Lorentz Symmetry at Indiana University.

Kostelecký was named a Fellow of the American Association for the Advancement of Science (AAAS) in 2006, a Fellow of the American Physical Society (APS) in 2004, and a Fellow of the English Institute of Physics in 2000. He chaired the APS committees for the Heineman Prize and the Pipkin Award in 2005. He received the Indiana University award for excellence in teaching in 1988 and 1992, the Frederic Bachman Lieber Teaching Award in 1997, and a Gravity Research Foundation Award twice, in 1993 and 2005. He received the 2025 Norman F. Ramsey Prize for applications of the Standard Model Extension to physical precision measurement tests.
