= Aether drag hypothesis =

Early attempt to explain constant speed of light

In the 19th century, the theory of the luminiferous aether as the hypothetical medium for the propagation of light waves was widely discussed. The aether hypothesis arose because physicists of that era could not conceive of light waves propagating without a physical medium in which to do so. When experiments failed to detect the hypothesized luminiferous aether, physicists conceived explanations for the experiments' failure which preserved the hypothetical aether's existence.

The aether drag hypothesis proposed that the luminiferous aether is dragged by or entrained within moving matter. According to one version of this hypothesis, no relative motion exists between Earth and aether. According to another version, the Earth does move relative to the aether and the measured speed of light should depend on the speed of this motion ("aether wind"), which should be measurable by instruments at rest on Earth's surface. In 1818, Augustin-Jean Fresnel proposed that the aether is partially entrained by matter. In 1845, George Stokes proposed that the aether is completely entrained within or in the vicinity of matter.

Although Fresnel's almost-stationary theory was apparently confirmed by the Fizeau experiment (1851), Stokes' theory was apparently confirmed by the Michelson–Morley experiment (1881, 1887). Hendrik Lorentz resolved this contradictory situation in his own aether theory, which banished any form of aether dragging. Albert Einstein's special theory of relativity (1905) excludes aether as a mechanical medium.

In modern physics (which is based on the theory of relativity and quantum mechanics), the aether as a "material substance" with a "state of motion" no longer plays any role. So questions concerning a possible "aether drag" are no longer considered meaningful by the scientific community. However, frame-dragging as predicted by general relativity, in which rotating masses distort the spacetime metric, causing a precession of the orbit of nearby particles, does exist. But this effect is orders of magnitude weaker than any "aether drag" discussed in this article.

== Partial aether dragging ==
In 1810, François Arago realised that variations in the refractive index of a substance predicted by the corpuscular theory would provide a useful method for measuring the velocity of light. These predictions arose because the refractive index of a substance such as glass depends on the ratio of the velocities of light in air and in the glass. Arago attempted to measure the extent to which corpuscles of light would be refracted by a glass prism at the front of a telescope. He expected that there would be a range of different angles of refraction due to the variety of different velocities of the stars and the motion of the Earth at different times of the day and year. Contrary to this expectation, he found that there was no difference in refraction between stars, between times of day or between seasons. All Arago observed was ordinary stellar aberration.

In 1818, Augustin-Jean Fresnel examined Arago's results using a wave theory of light. He realised that even if light were transmitted as waves the refractive index of the glass-air interface should have varied as the glass moved through the aether to strike the incoming waves at different velocities when the Earth rotated, and the seasons changed. Fresnel proposed that the glass prism would carry some of the aether along with it so that "...the aether is in excess inside the prism". He realised that the velocity of propagation of waves depends on the density of the medium and so proposed that the velocity of light in the prism would need to be adjusted by an amount of 'drag'. The velocity of light $v_n$ in the glass without any adjustment is given by:

$$v_n = \frac{c}{n}$$

The drag adjustment $v_d$ is given by:

$$v_d  = v \left(1 - \frac {\rho_e}{\rho_g} \right)$$

Where $\rho_e$ is the aether density in the environment, $\rho_g$ is the aether density in the glass and $v$ is the velocity of the prism with respect to the aether.

The factor $\left(1 - \frac {\rho_e}{\rho_g}\right)$ can be written as $\left(1 - \frac{1}{n^2}\right)$ because the refractive index, n, would be dependent on the density of the aether. This is known as the Fresnel drag coefficient. The velocity of light in the glass is then given by:

$$V = \frac {c}{n} + v \left(1 - \frac{1}{n^2} \right)$$

This correction was successful in explaining the null result of Arago's experiment. It introduces the concept of a largely stationary aether that is dragged by substances such as glass but not by air. Its success favoured the wave theory of light over the previous corpuscular theory.

=== Problems of partial aether dragging ===
Fresnel's dragging coefficient was directly confirmed by the Fizeau experiment and its repetitions. In general, with the aid of this coefficient the negative result of all optical aether drift experiments sensitive enough to detect first order effects (such as the experiments of Arago, Fizeau, Hoek, Airy, Mascart) can be explained. The notion of an (almost) stationary aether is also consistent with stellar aberration. However, this theory is considered to be refuted for the following reasons:

- It was already known in the 19th century, that partial aether dragging requires the relative velocity of aether and matter to be different for light of different colours – which is evidently not the case.
- Fresnel's theory of an (almost) stationary aether predicts positive results by experiments which are sensitive enough to detect second order effects. However, experiments such as the Michelson–Morley experiment and the Trouton–Noble experiment, gave negative results within their margin of error and are therefore considered refutations of Fresnel's aether.
- In the Hammar experiment, conducted by Gustaf Wilhelm Hammar in 1935, a common-path interferometer was used. Massive lead blocks were installed on both sides of only one leg of the interferometer. This arrangement should cause different amounts of aether drag and therefore produce a positive result. However, the result was again negative.

== Complete aether dragging ==
For George Stokes (1845) the model of an aether which is totally unaffected or only partially affected by moving matter was unnatural and unconvincing, so he assumed that the aether is completely dragged within and in the vicinity of matter, partially dragged at larger distances, and stays at rest in free space. Also Heinrich Rudolf Hertz (1890) incorporated a complete aether drag model within his elaboration of Maxwell's theory of electromagnetism, to bring it into accord with the Galilean principle of relativity. That is, if it is assumed that the aether is at rest within matter in one reference frame, the Galilean transformation gives the result that matter and (entrained) aether travel with the same speed in another frame of reference.

=== Problems of complete aether dragging ===
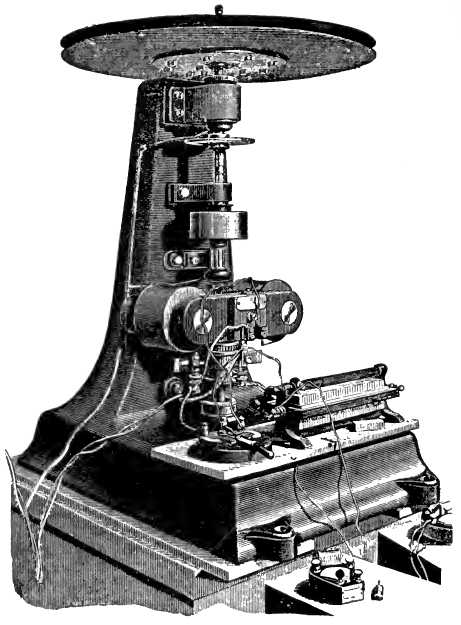
Lodge's ether machine. Light from a sensitive common path interferometer was guided between the rapidly rotating disks.

Complete aether dragging can explain the negative outcome of all aether drift experiments (like the Michelson–Morley experiment). However, this theory is considered to be wrong for the following reasons:

- The Fizeau experiment (1851) indicated only a partial entrainment of light.
- The Sagnac effect shows that two rays of light, emanated from the same light source in different directions on a rotating platform, require different times to come back to the light source. However, if the aether is completely dragged by the platform this effect should not occur at all.
- Oliver Lodge conducted experiments in the 1890s, seeking evidence that the propagation of light is influenced by being in the proximity of large rotating masses, and found no such influence.

=== Stokes' responses to those problems ===
Stokes already in 1845 introduced some additional assumptions in order to bring his theory into accord with experimental results. To explain aberration, he assumed that his incompressible aether is irrotational as well, which would give, in connection with his specific model of aether drag, the correct law of aberration. To reproduce Fresnel's dragging coefficient (and therefore to explain the Fizeau experiment) he argued that the aether is completely dragged within a medium – i.e. the aether gets condensed when it enters the medium and rarefied when it leaves it again, which modifies the speed of the aether as well as that of light and leads to the same expression as Fresnel's.

Even though Stokes' aberration theory was considered viable for some time, it had to be given up because Lorentz argued in 1886, that when the aether is incompressible as in Stokes' theory, and if the aether has the same normal component of velocity as the Earth, it would not have the same tangential component of velocity, so all conditions posed by Stokes cannot be fulfilled at the same time.

=== Gravitational aether drag ===
Another version of Stokes' model was proposed by Theodor des Coudres and Wilhelm Wien (1900). They assumed that aether dragging is proportional to the gravitational mass. That is, the aether is completely dragged by the Earth, and only partially dragged by smaller objects on Earth. And to save Stokes's explanation of aberration, Max Planck (1899) argued in a letter to Lorentz, that the aether might not be incompressible, but condensed by gravitation in the vicinity of Earth, and this would give the conditions needed for the theory of Stokes ("Stokes-Planck theory"). When compared with the experiments above, this model can explain the positive results of the experiments of Fizeau and Sagnac, because the small mass of those instruments can only partially (or not at all) drag the aether, and for the same reason it explains the negative result of Lodge's experiments. It is also compatible with Hammar's and Michelson–Morley experiment, as the aether is completely dragged by the large mass of Earth.

However, this theory was directly refuted by the Michelson–Gale–Pearson experiment (1925). The great difference of this experiment against the usual Sagnac experiments is the fact that the rotation of Earth itself was measured. If the aether is completely dragged by the Earth's gravitational field, a negative result has to be expected - but the result was positive.

And from a theoretical side it was noted by Hendrik Antoon Lorentz, that the Stokes-Planck hypothesis requires that the speed of light is not affected by a density increase of 50,000 times of the aether. So Lorentz and Planck himself rejected this hypothesis as improbable.

== Lorentz and Einstein ==
Since Lorentz was forced to abandon Stokes' hypothesis, he chose Fresnel's model as a starting point. He was able to reproduce Fresnel's dragging coefficient in 1892, though in Lorentz's theory it represents a modification of the propagation of light waves, not the result of any aether entrainment. Therefore, Lorentz's aether is fully stationary or immobile. However, this leads to the same problem that already afflicted Fresnel's model: it stood in contradiction with the Michelson–Morley experiment. Therefore, George Francis FitzGerald (1889) and Lorentz (1892) introduced length contraction, that is, all bodies contract in the line of motion by the factor $\sqrt{1-v^{2}/c^{2}}$. In addition, in Lorentz's theory the Galilean transformation was replaced by the Lorentz transformation.

However, the accumulation of hypotheses to rescue the stationary aether concept was considered to be very artificial. So, it was Albert Einstein (1905), who recognized that it is only required to assume the principle of relativity and the constancy of the speed of light in all inertial frames of reference, in order to develop the theory of special relativity and to derive the complete Lorentz transformation. All this was done without using the stationary aether concept.

As shown by Max von Laue (1907), special relativity predicts the result of the Fizeau experiment from the velocity addition theorem without any need for an aether. If $V$ is the velocity of light relative to the Fizeau apparatus and $U$ is the velocity of light relative to the water and $v$ is the velocity of the water:

$$U = \frac {c}{n}$$

$$V = \frac {c/n + v}{1 + v/nc}$$

which, if v/c is small can be expanded using the binomial expansion to become:

$$V \approx \frac {c}{n} + v \left(1 - \frac{1}{n^2} \right)$$

This is identical to Fresnel equation.

== Allais aether hypothesis ==
Maurice Allais proposed in 1959 an aether hypothesis involving a wind velocity of about 8 km/s, much lower than the standard value of 30 km/s supported by scientists of the nineteenth century, and compatible with the Michelson–Morley and the disputed Dayton Miller experiments, as well as his own experiments. The controversial Allais effect is not predicted by general relativity and his experimental results have been disputed.

== See also ==
- History of special relativity
- Tests of special relativity
- Tests of general relativity
- Frame-dragging
