= Lorentz ether theory =

Defunct theory of electromagnetism

What is now often called Lorentz ether theory (LET) has its roots in Hendrik Lorentz's "theory of electrons", which marked the end of the development of the classical aether theories at the end of the 19th and at the beginning of the 20th century.

Lorentz's initial theory was created between 1892 and 1895 and was based on removing assumptions about aether motion. It explained the failure of the negative aether drift experiments to first order in v/c by introducing an auxiliary variable called "local time" for connecting systems at rest and in motion in the aether. In addition, the negative result of the Michelson–Morley experiment led to the introduction of the hypothesis of length contraction in 1892. However, other experiments also produced negative results and (guided by Henri Poincaré's principle of relativity) Lorentz tried in 1899 and 1904 to expand his theory to all orders in v/c by introducing the Lorentz transformation. In addition, he assumed that non-electromagnetic forces (if they exist) transform like electric forces. However, Lorentz's expression for charge density and current were incorrect, so his theory did not fully exclude the possibility of detecting the aether. Eventually, it was Henri Poincaré who in 1905 corrected the errors in Lorentz's paper and actually incorporated non-electromagnetic forces (including gravitation) within the theory, which he called "The New Mechanics". Many aspects of Lorentz's theory were incorporated into special relativity (SR) with the works of Albert Einstein and Hermann Minkowski.

Today LET is often treated as some sort of "Lorentzian" or "neo-Lorentzian" interpretation of special relativity. The introduction of length contraction and time dilation for all phenomena in a "preferred" frame of reference, which plays the role of Lorentz's immobile aether, leads to the complete Lorentz transformation (see the Robertson–Mansouri–Sexl test theory as an example), so Lorentz covariance doesn't provide any experimentally verifiable distinctions between LET and SR. The absolute simultaneity in the Mansouri–Sexl test theory formulation of LET implies that a one-way speed of light experiment could in principle distinguish between LET and SR, but it is now widely held that it is impossible to perform such a test. In the absence of any way to experimentally distinguish between LET and SR, SR is widely preferred over LET, due to the superfluous assumption of an undetectable aether in LET, and the validity of the relativity principle in LET seeming ad hoc or coincidental.

== Historical development ==
=== Basic concept ===
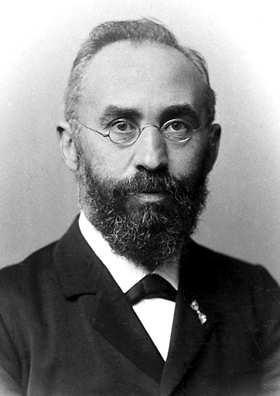
Hendrik Lorentz

The Lorentz ether theory, which was developed mainly between 1892 and 1906 by Lorentz and Poincaré, was based on the aether theory of Augustin-Jean Fresnel, Maxwell's equations and the electron theory of Rudolf Clausius. (Note: Whittaker (1951), 386ff) Lorentz's 1895 paper rejected the aether drift theories, and refused to express assumptions about the nature of the aether. It said:

That we cannot speak about an absolute rest of the aether, is self-evident; this expression would not even make sense. When I say for the sake of brevity, that the aether would be at rest, then this only means that one part of this medium does not move against the other one and that all perceptible motions are relative motions of the celestial bodies in relation to the aether.

As Max Born later said, it was natural (though not logically necessary) for scientists of that time to identify the rest frame of the Lorentz aether with the absolute space of Isaac Newton. (Note: Born (1964), 172ff) The condition of this aether can be described by the electric field E and the magnetic field H, where these fields represent the "states" of the aether (with no further specification), related to the charges of the electrons. Thus an abstract electromagnetic aether replaces the older mechanistic aether models. Contrary to Clausius, who accepted that the electrons operate by actions at a distance, the electromagnetic field of the aether appears as a mediator between the electrons, and changes in this field can propagate not faster than the speed of light. Lorentz theoretically explained the Zeeman effect on the basis of his theory, for which he received the Nobel Prize in Physics in 1902. Joseph Larmor found a similar theory simultaneously, but his concept was based on a mechanical aether. A fundamental concept of Lorentz's theory in 1895 (Note: Lorentz (1895)) was the "theorem of corresponding states" for terms of order v/c. This theorem states that a moving observer with respect to the aether can use the same electrodynamic equations as an observer in the stationary aether system, thus they are making the same observations.

=== Length contraction ===
A big challenge for the Lorentz ether theory was the Michelson–Morley experiment in 1887. According to the theories of Fresnel and Lorentz, a relative motion to an immobile aether had to be determined by this experiment; however, the result was negative. Michelson himself thought that the result confirmed the aether drag hypothesis, in which the aether is fully dragged by matter. However, other experiments like the Fizeau experiment and the effect of aberration disproved that model.

A possible solution came in sight, when in 1889 Oliver Heaviside derived from Maxwell's equations that the magnetic vector potential field around a moving body is altered by a factor of $\sqrt{1- v^2 / c^2}$. Based on that result, and to bring the hypothesis of an immobile aether into accordance with the Michelson–Morley experiment, George FitzGerald in 1889 (qualitatively) and, independently of him, Lorentz in 1892 (Note: Lorentz (1892)) (already quantitatively), suggested that not only the electrostatic fields, but also the molecular forces, are affected in such a way that the dimension of a body in the line of motion is less by the value $v^2/(2c^2)$ than the dimension perpendicularly to the line of motion. However, an observer co-moving with the earth would not notice this contraction because all other instruments contract at the same ratio. In 1895 Lorentz proposed three possible explanations for this relative contraction: (Note: Brown (2001))

- The body contracts in the line of motion and preserves its dimension perpendicularly to it.
- The dimension of the body remains the same in the line of motion, but it expands perpendicularly to it.
- The body contracts in the line of motion and expands at the same time perpendicularly to it.

Although the possible connection between electrostatic and intermolecular forces was used by Lorentz as a plausibility argument, the contraction hypothesis was soon considered as purely ad hoc. It is also important that this contraction would only affect the space between the electrons but not the electrons themselves; therefore the name "intermolecular hypothesis" was sometimes used for this effect. The so-called Length contraction without expansion perpendicularly to the line of motion and by the precise value $l=l_0 \cdot \sqrt{1- v^2 / c^2}$ (where l_{0} is the length at rest in the aether) was given by Larmor in 1897 and by Lorentz in 1904. In the same year, Lorentz also argued that electrons themselves are also affected by this contraction. (Note: Miller (1981), 70–75,) For further development of this concept, see the section § Lorentz transformation. (Note: Lorentz (1904b))

=== Local time ===
An important part of the theorem of corresponding states in 1892 and 1895 was the local time $t'=t - vx / c^2$, where t is the time coordinate for an observer resting in the aether, and t' is the time coordinate for an observer moving in the aether. (Woldemar Voigt had previously used the same expression for local time in 1887 in connection with the Doppler effect and an incompressible medium.) With the help of this concept Lorentz could explain the aberration of light, the Doppler effect and the Fizeau experiment (i.e. measurements of the Fresnel drag coefficient) by Hippolyte Fizeau in moving and also resting liquids. While for Lorentz length contraction was a real physical effect, he considered the time transformation only as a heuristic working hypothesis and a mathematical stipulation to simplify the calculation from the resting to a "fictitious" moving system. Contrary to Lorentz, Poincaré saw more than a mathematical trick in the definition of local time, which he called Lorentz's "most ingenious idea". (Note: Poincaré (1904); Poincaré (1905a), Ch. 8) In The Measure of Time he wrote in 1898: (Note: Poincaré (1898); Poincaré (1905a), Ch. 2)

We do not have a direct intuition for simultaneity, just as little as for the equality of two periods. If we believe to have this intuition, it is an illusion. We helped ourselves with certain rules, which we usually use without giving us account over it [...] We choose these rules therefore, not because they are true, but because they are the most convenient, and we could summarize them while saying: „The simultaneity of two events, or the order of their succession, the equality of two durations, are to be so defined that the enunciation of the natural laws may be as simple as possible. In other words, all these rules, all these definitions are only the fruit of an unconscious opportunism.“ (Note: French original: Nous n’avons pas l’intuition directe de la simultanéité, pas plus que celle de l’égalité de deux durées. Si nous croyons avoir cette intuition, c’est une illusion. Nous y suppléons à l’aide de certaines règles que nous appliquons presque toujours sans nous en rendre compte. [...] Nous choisissons donc ces règles, non parce qu’elles sont vraies, mais parce qu’elles sont les plus commodes, et nous pourrions les résumer en disant: « La simultanéité de deux événements, ou l’ordre de leur succession, l’égalité de deux durées, doivent être définies de telle sorte que l’énoncé des lois naturelles soit aussi simple que possible. En d’autres termes, toutes ces règles, toutes ces définitions ne sont que le fruit d’un opportunisme inconscient. »)

In 1900 Poincaré interpreted local time as the result of a synchronization procedure based on light signals. He assumed that two observers, A and B, who are moving in the aether, synchronize their clocks by optical signals. Since they treat themselves as being at rest, they must consider only the transmission time of the signals and then crossing their observations to examine whether their clocks are synchronous. However, from the point of view of an observer at rest in the aether the clocks are not synchronous and indicate the local time $t'=t - vx / c^2$. But because the moving observers don't know anything about their movement, they don't recognize this. (Note: Poincaré (1900b)) In 1904, he illustrated the same procedure in the following way: A sends a signal at time 0 to B, which arrives at time t. B also sends a signal at time 0 to A, which arrives at time t. If in both cases t has the same value, the clocks are synchronous, but only in the system in which the clocks are at rest in the aether. So, according to Darrigol, (Note: Darrigol (2005), 10–11) Poincaré understood local time as a physical effect just like length contraction – in contrast to Lorentz, who did not use the same interpretation before 1906. However, contrary to Einstein, who later used a similar synchronization procedure which was called Einstein synchronisation, Darrigol says that Poincaré had the opinion that clocks resting in the aether are showing the true time.

However, at the beginning it was unknown that local time includes what is now known as time dilation. This effect was first noticed by Larmor (1897), who wrote that "individual electrons describe corresponding parts of their orbits in times shorter for the [aether] system in the ratio $\varepsilon^{-1/2}$ or $\left(1-(1/2)v^2/c^2\right)$". And in 1899 (Note: Lorentz (1899)) also Lorentz noted for the frequency of oscillating electrons "that in S the time of vibrations be $k\varepsilon$ times as great as in S_{0}", where S_{0} is the aether frame, S the mathematical-fictitious frame of the moving observer, k is $\sqrt{1- v^2 / c^2}$, and $\varepsilon$ is an undetermined factor. (Note: Janssen (1995), Chap. 3.5.4)

=== Lorentz transformation ===
While local time could explain the negative aether drift experiments to first order to v/c, it was necessary – due to other unsuccessful aether drift experiments like the Trouton–Noble experiment – to modify the hypothesis to include second-order effects. The mathematical tool for that is the so-called Lorentz transformation. Voigt in 1887 had already derived a similar set of equations (although with a different scale factor). Afterwards, Larmor in 1897 and Lorentz in 1899 derived equations in a form algebraically equivalent to those which are used up to this day, although Lorentz used an undetermined factor l in his transformation. In his paper Electromagnetic phenomena in a system moving with any velocity smaller than that of light (1904) Lorentz attempted to create such a theory, according to which all forces between the molecules are affected by the Lorentz transformation (in which Lorentz set the factor l to unity) in the same manner as electrostatic forces. In other words, Lorentz attempted to create a theory in which the relative motion of earth and aether is (nearly or fully) undetectable. Therefore, he generalized the contraction hypothesis and argued that not only the forces between the electrons, but also the electrons themselves are contracted in the line of motion. However, Max Abraham (1904) quickly noted a defect of that theory: Within a purely electromagnetic theory the contracted electron-configuration is unstable and one has to introduce non-electromagnetic force to stabilize the electrons – Abraham himself questioned the possibility of including such forces within the theory of Lorentz.

So it was Poincaré, on 5 June 1905, (Note: Poincaré (1905b)) who introduced the so-called "Poincaré stresses" to solve that problem. Those stresses were interpreted by him as an external, non-electromagnetic pressure, which stabilize the electrons and also served as an explanation for length contraction. (Note: Janssen/Mecklenburg (2007)) Although he argued that Lorentz succeeded in creating a theory which complies to the postulate of relativity, he showed that Lorentz's equations of electrodynamics were not fully Lorentz covariant. So by pointing out the group characteristics of the transformation, Poincaré demonstrated the Lorentz covariance of the Maxwell–Lorentz equations and corrected Lorentz's transformation formulae for charge density and current density. He went on to sketch a model of gravitation (incl. gravitational waves) which might be compatible with the transformations. It was Poincaré who, for the first time, used the term "Lorentz transformation", and he gave them a form which is used up to this day. (Where $\ell$ is an arbitrary function of $\varepsilon$, which must be set to unity to conserve the group characteristics. He also set the speed of light to unity.)

$$x^\prime = k\ell\left(x + \varepsilon t\right), \qquad y^\prime = \ell y, \qquad z^\prime = \ell z, \qquad t^\prime = k\ell\left(t + \varepsilon x\right)$$
$$k = \frac 1 {\sqrt{1-\varepsilon^2}}$$

A substantially extended work (the so-called "Palermo paper") (Note: Poincaré (1906)) was submitted by Poincaré on 23 July 1905, but was published in January 1906 because the journal appeared only twice a year. He spoke literally of "the postulate of relativity", he showed that the transformations are a consequence of the principle of least action; he demonstrated in more detail the group characteristics of the transformation, which he called Lorentz group, and he showed that the combination $x^2+ y^2+ z^2- c^2t^2$ is invariant. While elaborating his gravitational theory, he noticed that the Lorentz transformation is merely a rotation in four-dimensional space about the origin by introducing $ct\sqrt{-1}$ as a fourth, imaginary, coordinate, and he used an early form of four-vectors. However, Poincaré later said the translation of physics into the language of four-dimensional geometry would entail too much effort for limited profit, and therefore he refused to work out the consequences of this notion. This was later done, however, by Minkowski; see "The shift to relativity". (Note: Walter (2007), Kap. 1)

=== Electromagnetic mass ===
J. J. Thomson (1881) and others noticed that electromagnetic energy contributes to the mass of charged bodies by the amount $m=(4/3)E/c^2$, which was called electromagnetic or "apparent mass". Another derivation of some sort of electromagnetic mass was conducted by Poincaré (1900). By using the momentum of electromagnetic fields, he concluded that these fields contribute a mass of $E_{em}/c^2$ to all bodies, which is necessary to save the center of mass theorem.

As noted by Thomson and others, this mass increases also with velocity. Thus in 1899, Lorentz calculated that the ratio of the electron's mass in the moving frame and that of the aether frame is $k^3 \varepsilon$ parallel to the direction of motion, and $k\varepsilon$ perpendicular to the direction of motion, where $k = \sqrt{1- v^2 / c^2}$ and $\varepsilon$ is an undetermined factor. And in 1904, he set $\varepsilon=1$, arriving at the expressions for the masses in different directions (longitudinal and transverse):

$$m_L=\frac{m_0}{\left(\sqrt{1-\frac{v^2}{c^2}}\right)^3},\quad m_T=\frac{m_0}{\sqrt{1-\frac{v^2}{c^2}}},$$

where

$$m_0=\frac{4}{3}\frac{E_{em}}{c^2}$$

Many scientists now believed that the entire mass and all forms of forces were electromagnetic in nature. This idea had to be given up, however, in the course of the development of relativistic mechanics. Abraham (1904) argued (as described in the preceding section #Lorentz transformation), that non-electrical binding forces were necessary within Lorentz's electrons model. But Abraham also noted that different results occurred, dependent on whether the em-mass is calculated from the energy or from the momentum. To solve those problems, Poincaré in 1905 and 1906 introduced some sort of pressure of non-electrical nature, which contributes the amount $-(1/3)E/c^2$ to the energy of the bodies, and therefore explains the 4/3-factor in the expression for the electromagnetic mass-energy relation. However, while Poincaré's expression for the energy of the electrons was correct, he erroneously stated that only the em-energy contributes to the mass of the bodies. (Note: Janssen/Mecklenburg (2007))

The concept of electromagnetic mass is not considered anymore as the cause of mass per se, because the entire mass (not only the electromagnetic part) is proportional to energy, and can be converted into different forms of energy, which is explained by Einstein's mass–energy equivalence. (Note: Miller (1981), 359–360)

=== Gravitation ===
==== Lorentz's theories ====
In 1900 (Note: Lorentz (1900)) Lorentz tried to explain gravity on the basis of the Maxwell equations. He first considered a Le Sage type model and argued that there possibly exists a universal radiation field, consisting of very penetrating em-radiation, and exerting a uniform pressure on every body. Lorentz showed that an attractive force between charged particles would indeed arise, if it is assumed that the incident energy is entirely absorbed. This was the same fundamental problem which had afflicted the other Le Sage models, because the radiation must vanish somehow and any absorption must lead to an enormous heating. Therefore, Lorentz abandoned this model.

In the same paper, he assumed like Ottaviano Fabrizio Mossotti and Johann Karl Friedrich Zöllner that the attraction of opposite charged particles is stronger than the repulsion of equal charged particles. The resulting net force is exactly what is known as universal gravitation, in which the speed of gravity is that of light. This leads to a conflict with the law of gravitation by Isaac Newton, in which it was shown by Pierre Simon Laplace that a finite speed of gravity leads to some sort of aberration and therefore makes the orbits unstable. However, Lorentz showed that the theory is not concerned by Laplace's critique, because due to the structure of the Maxwell equations only effects in the order v^{2}/c^{2} arise. But Lorentz calculated that the value for the perihelion advance of Mercury was much too low. He wrote:

The special form of these terms may perhaps be modified. Yet, what has been said is sufficient to show that gravitation may be attributed to actions which are propagated with no greater velocity than that of light.

In 1908 (Note: Poincaré (1908a); Poincaré (1908b) Book 3, Ch. 3) Poincaré examined the gravitational theory of Lorentz and classified it as compatible with the relativity principle, but (like Lorentz) he criticized the inaccurate indication of the perihelion advance of Mercury. Contrary to Poincaré, Lorentz in 1914 considered his own theory as incompatible with the relativity principle and rejected it. (Note: Lorentz (1914) primary sources)

==== Lorentz-invariant gravitational law ====
Poincaré argued in 1904 that a propagation speed of gravity which is greater than c is contradicting the concept of local time and the relativity principle. He wrote:

What would happen if we could communicate by signals other than those of light, the velocity of propagation of which differed from that of light? If, after having regulated our watches by the optimal method, we wished to verify the result by means of these new signals, we should observe discrepancies due to the common translatory motion of the two stations. And are such signals inconceivable, if we take the view of Laplace, that universal gravitation is transmitted with a velocity a million times as great as that of light?

However, in 1905 and 1906 Poincaré pointed out the possibility of a gravitational theory, in which changes propagate with the speed of light and which is Lorentz covariant. He pointed out that in such a theory the gravitational force not only depends on the masses and their mutual distance, but also on their velocities and their position due to the finite propagation time of interaction. On that occasion Poincaré introduced four-vectors. Following Poincaré, also Minkowski (1908) and Arnold Sommerfeld (1910) tried to establish a Lorentz-invariant gravitational law. (Note: Walter (2007)) However, these attempts were superseded because of Einstein's theory of general relativity, see "The shift to relativity".

The non-existence of a generalization of the Lorentz ether to gravity was a major reason for the preference for the spacetime interpretation. A viable generalization to gravity has been proposed only 2012 by Schmelzer. The preferred frame is defined by the harmonic coordinate condition. The gravitational field is defined by density, velocity and stress tensor of the Lorentz ether, so that the harmonic conditions become continuity and Euler equations. The Einstein Equivalence Principle is derived. The Strong Equivalence Principle is violated, but is recovered in a limit, which gives the Einstein equations of general relativity in harmonic coordinates.

== Principles and conventions ==
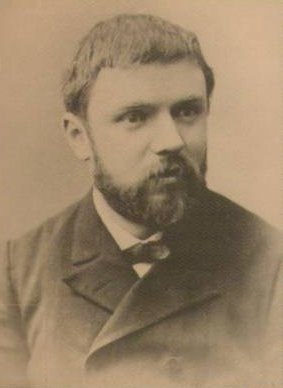
Henri Poincaré

=== Constancy of the speed of light ===
Already in his philosophical writing on time measurements (1898), Poincaré wrote that astronomers like Ole Rømer, in determining the speed of light, simply assume that light has a constant speed, and that this speed is the same in all directions. Without this postulate it would not be possible to infer the speed of light from astronomical observations, as Rømer did based on observations of the moons of Jupiter. Poincaré went on to note that Rømer also had to assume that Jupiter's moons obey Newton's laws, including the law of gravitation, whereas it would be possible to reconcile a different speed of light with the same observations if we assumed some different (probably more complicated) laws of motion. According to Poincaré, this illustrates that we adopt for the speed of light a value that makes the laws of mechanics as simple as possible. (This is an example of Poincaré's conventionalist philosophy.) Poincaré also noted that the propagation speed of light can be (and in practice often is) used to define simultaneity between spatially separate events. However, in that paper he did not go on to discuss the consequences of applying these "conventions" to multiple relatively moving systems of reference. This next step was done by Poincaré in 1900, when he recognized that synchronization by light signals in earth's reference frame leads to Lorentz's local time. (Note: Galison (2002)) (Note: Miller (1981), 186–189) (See the section on "local time" above). And in 1904 Poincaré wrote:

From all these results, if they were to be confirmed, would issue a wholly new mechanics which would be characterized above all by this fact, that there could be no velocity greater than that of light, any more than a temperature below that of absolute zero. For an observer, participating himself in a motion of translation of which he has no suspicion, no apparent velocity could surpass that of light, and this would be a contradiction, unless one recalls the fact that this observer does not use the same sort of timepiece as that used by a stationary observer, but rather a watch giving the “local time.[..] Perhaps, too, we shall have to construct an entirely new mechanics that we only succeed in catching a glimpse of, where, inertia increasing with the velocity, the velocity of light would become an impassable limit. The ordinary mechanics, more simple, would remain a first approximation, since it would be true for velocities not too great, so that the old dynamics would still be found under the new. We should not have to regret having believed in the principles, and even, since velocities too great for the old formulas would always be only exceptional, the surest way in practise would be still to act as if we continued to believe in them. They are so useful, it would be necessary to keep a place for them. To determine to exclude them altogether would be to deprive oneself of a precious weapon. I hasten to say in conclusion that we are not yet there, and as yet nothing proves that the principles will not come forth from out the fray victorious and intact.”

=== Principle of relativity ===
In 1895 (Note: Poincaré (1895)) (Note: Katzir (2005), 275–288) Poincaré argued that experiments like that of Michelson–Morley show that it seems to be impossible to detect the absolute motion of matter or the relative motion of matter in relation to the aether. And although most physicists had other views, Poincaré in 1900 (Note: Poincaré (1900a); Poincaré (1902), Ch. 9–10) stood to his opinion and alternately used the expressions "principle of relative motion" and "relativity of space". He criticized Lorentz by saying, that it would be better to create a more fundamental theory, which explains the absence of any aether drift, than to create one hypothesis after the other. In 1902 (Note: Poincaré (1902), Ch. 13) he used for the first time the expression "principle of relativity". In 1904 he appreciated the work of the mathematicians, who saved what he now called the "principle of relativity" with the help of hypotheses like local time, but he confessed that this venture was possible only by an accumulation of hypotheses. And he defined the principle in this way (according to Miller (Note: Miller (1981), 79) based on Lorentz's theorem of corresponding states): "The principle of relativity, according to which the laws of physical phenomena must be the same for a stationary observer as for one carried along in a uniform motion of translation, so that we have no means, and can have none, of determining whether or not we are being carried along in such a motion."

Referring to the critique of Poincaré from 1900, Lorentz wrote in his famous paper in 1904, where he extended his theorem of corresponding states: "Surely, the course of inventing special hypotheses for each new experimental result is somewhat artificial. It would be more satisfactory, if it were possible to show, by means of certain fundamental assumptions, and without neglecting terms of one order of magnitude or another, that many electromagnetic actions are entirely independent of the motion of the system."

One of the first assessments of Lorentz's paper was by Paul Langevin in May 1905. According to him, this extension of the electron theories of Lorentz and Larmor led to "the physical impossibility to demonstrate the translational motion of the earth". However, Poincaré noticed in 1905 that Lorentz's theory of 1904 was not perfectly "Lorentz invariant" in a few equations such as Lorentz's expression for current density (Lorentz admitted in 1921 that these were defects). As this required just minor modifications of Lorentz's work, also Poincaré asserted that Lorentz had succeeded in harmonizing his theory with the principle of relativity: "It appears that this impossibility of demonstrating the absolute motion of the earth is a general law of nature. [...] Lorentz tried to complete and modify his hypothesis in order to harmonize it with the postulate of complete impossibility of determining absolute motion. It is what he has succeeded in doing in his article entitled Electromagnetic phenomena in a system moving with any velocity smaller than that of light [Lorentz, 1904b]." (Note: French original: Il semble que cette impossibilité de démontrer le mouvement absolu soit une loi générale de la nature [..] Lorentz a cherché à compléter et à modifier son hypothèse de façon à la mettre en concordance avec le postulate de l'impossibilité complète de la détermination du mouvement absolu. C'est ce qu'il a réussi dans son article intitulé Electromagnetic phenomena in a system moving with any velocity smaller than that of light.)

In his Palermo paper (1906), Poincaré called this "the postulate of relativity“, and although he stated that it was possible this principle might be disproved at some point (and in fact he mentioned at the paper's end that the discovery of magneto-cathode rays by Paul Ulrich Villard (1904) seems to threaten it (Note: Walter (2007), Chap. 1)), he believed it was interesting to consider the consequences if we were to assume the postulate of relativity was valid without restriction. This would imply that all forces of nature (not just electromagnetism) must be invariant under the Lorentz transformation. In 1921 Lorentz credited Poincaré for establishing the principle and postulate of relativity and wrote: (Note: Lorentz (1921), pp. 247–261) "I have not established the principle of relativity as rigorously and universally true. Poincaré, on the other hand, has obtained a perfect invariance of the electro-magnetic equations, and he has formulated 'the postulate of relativity', terms which he was the first to employ." (Note: French original: je n'ai pas établi le principe de relativité comme rigoureusement et universellement vrai. Poincaré, au contraire, a obtenu une invariance parfaite des équations de l’électrodynamique, et il a formule le « postulat de relativité », termes qu’il a été le premier a employer.)

=== Aether ===
Poincaré wrote in the sense of his conventionalist philosophy in 1889: (Note: Poincaré (1889); Poincaré (1902), Ch. 12) "Whether the aether exists or not matters little – let us leave that to the metaphysicians; what is essential for us is, that everything happens as if it existed, and that this hypothesis is found to be suitable for the explanation of phenomena. After all, have we any other reason for believing in the existence of material objects? That, too, is only a convenient hypothesis; only, it will never cease to be so, while some day, no doubt, the aether will be thrown aside as useless."

He also denied the existence of absolute space and time by saying in 1901: (Note: Poincaré (1901a); Poincaré (1902), Ch. 6) "1. There is no absolute space, and we only conceive of relative motion; and yet in most cases mechanical facts are enunciated as if there is an absolute space to which they can be referred. 2. There is no absolute time. When we say that two periods are equal, the statement has no meaning, and can only acquire a meaning by a convention. 3. Not only have we no direct intuition of the equality of two periods, but we have not even direct intuition of the simultaneity of two events occurring in two different places. I have explained this in an article entitled "Mesure du Temps" [1898]. 4. Finally, is not our Euclidean geometry in itself only a kind of convention of language?"

However, Poincaré himself never abandoned the aether hypothesis and stated in 1900: "Does our aether actually exist ? We know the origin of our belief in the aether. If light takes several years to reach us from a distant star, it is no longer on the star, nor is it on the earth. It must be somewhere, and supported, so to speak, by some material agency." And referring to the Fizeau experiment, he even wrote: "The aether is all but in our grasp." He also said the aether is necessary to harmonize Lorentz's theory with Newton's third law. Even in 1912 in a paper called "The Quantum Theory", Poincaré ten times used the word "aether", and described light as "luminous vibrations of the aether". (Note: Poincaré 1912; Poincaré 1913, Ch. 6)

And although he admitted the relative and conventional character of space and time, he believed that the classical convention is more "convenient" and continued to distinguish between "true" time in the aether and "apparent" time in moving systems. Addressing the question if a new convention of space and time is needed he wrote in 1912: (Note: Poincaré (1913), Ch. 2) "Shall we be obliged to modify our conclusions? Certainly not; we had adopted a convention because it seemed convenient and we had said that nothing could constrain us to abandon it. Today some physicists want to adopt a new convention. It is not that they are constrained to do so; they consider this new convention more convenient; that is all. And those who are not of this opinion can legitimately retain the old one in order not to disturb their old habits, I believe, just between us, that this is what they shall do for a long time to come."

Also Lorentz argued during his lifetime that in all frames of reference this one has to be preferred, in which the aether is at rest. Clocks in this frame are showing the "real“ time and simultaneity is not relative. However, if the correctness of the relativity principle is accepted, it is impossible to find this system by experiment. (Note: Lorentz (1913), p. 75)

== The shift to relativity ==
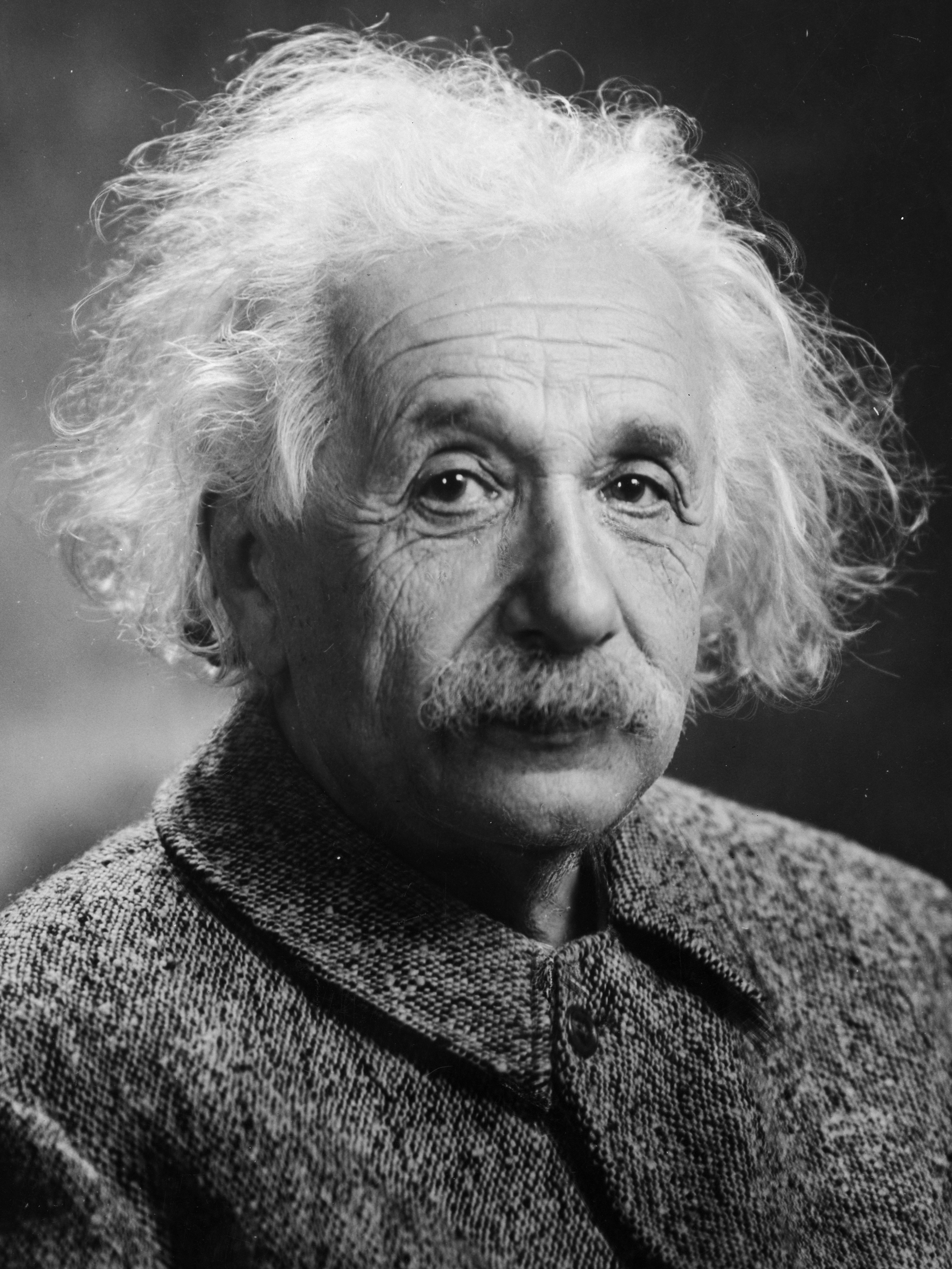
Albert Einstein

=== Special relativity ===
In 1905, Albert Einstein published his paper on what is now called special relativity. (Note: Einstein (1905a)) In this paper, by examining the fundamental meanings of the space and time coordinates used in physical theories, Einstein showed that the "effective" coordinates given by the Lorentz transformation were in fact the inertial coordinates of relatively moving frames of reference. From this followed all of the physically observable consequences of LET, along with others, all without the need to postulate an unobservable entity (the aether). Einstein identified two fundamental principles, each founded on experience, from which all of Lorentz's electrodynamics follows:

(1)	The laws by which physical processes occur are the same with respect to any system of inertial coordinates (the principle of relativity)
(2)	In empty space light propagates at an absolute speed c in any system of inertial coordinates (the principle of the constancy of light)

Taken together (along with a few other tacit assumptions such as isotropy and homogeneity of space), these two postulates lead uniquely to the mathematics of special relativity. Lorentz and Poincaré had also adopted these same principles, as necessary to achieve their final results, but didn't recognize that they were also sufficient, and hence that they obviated all the other assumptions underlying Lorentz's initial derivations (many of which later turned out to be incorrect (Note: The three best known examples are (1) the assumption of Maxwell's equations, and (2) the assumptions about finite structure of the electron, and (3) the assumption that all mass was of electromagnetic origin. Maxwell's equations were subsequently found to be invalid and were replaced with quantum electrodynamics, although one particular feature of Maxwell's equations, the invariance of a characteristic speed, has remained. The electron's mass is now regarded as a pointlike particle, and Poincaré already showed in 1905 that it is not possible for all the mass of the electron to be electromagnetic in origin. This is how relativity invalidated the 19th century hopes for basing all of physics on electromagnetism.)). Therefore, special relativity very quickly gained wide acceptance among physicists, and the 19th century concept of a luminiferous aether was no longer considered useful. (Note: Darrigol (2005), 15–18) (Note: Janssen (1995), Kap. 4)

Poincare (1905) and Hermann Minkowski (1905) showed that special relativity had a very natural interpretation (Note: See Whittaker's History of the Aether, in which he writes, "The great advances made by Minkowski were connected with his formulation of physics in terms of a four-dimensional manifold... in order to represent natural phenomena without introducing contingent elements, it is necessary to abandon the customary three-dimensional system of coordinates and to operate in four dimensions". See also Pais's Subtle is the Lord, in which it says of Minkowski's interpretation "Thus began the enormous simplification of special relativity". See also Miller's "Albert Einstein's Special Theory of Relativity" in which it says "Minkowski's results led to a deeper understanding of relativity theory".) in terms of a unified four-dimensional "spacetime" in which absolute intervals are seen to be given by an extension of the Pythagorean theorem. (Note: Walter (1999)) The utility and naturalness of the spacetime representation contributed to the rapid acceptance of special relativity, and to the corresponding loss of interest in Lorentz's aether theory.

In 1909 (Note: Einstein (1909)) and 1912 (Note: Einstein (1912)) Einstein explained: (Note: Martinez (2009))

...it is impossible to base a theory of the transformation laws of space and time on the principle of relativity alone. As we know, this is connected with the relativity of the concepts of "simultaneity" and "shape of moving bodies." To fill this gap, I introduced the principle of the constancy of the velocity of light, which I borrowed from H. A. Lorentz’s theory of the stationary luminiferous aether, and which, like the principle of relativity, contains a physical assumption that seemed to be justified only by the relevant experiments (experiments by Fizeau, Rowland, etc.)

In 1907 Einstein criticized the "ad hoc" character of Lorentz's contraction hypothesis in his theory of electrons, because according to him it was an artificial assumption to make the Michelson–Morley experiment conform to Lorentz's stationary aether and the relativity principle. (Note: Einstein (1908a)) Einstein argued that Lorentz's "local time" can simply be called "time", and he stated that the immobile aether as the theoretical foundation of electrodynamics was unsatisfactory. (Note: Einstein (1907)) He wrote in 1920: (Note: Einstein (1922))

As to the mechanical nature of the Lorentzian aether, it may be said of it, in a somewhat playful spirit, that immobility is the only mechanical property of which it has not been deprived by H. A. Lorentz. It may be added that the whole change in the conception of the aether which the special theory of relativity brought about, consisted in taking away from the aether its last mechanical quality, namely, its immobility. [...] More careful reflection teaches us, however, that the special theory of relativity does not compel us to deny aether. We may assume the existence of an aether; only we must give up ascribing a definite state of motion to it, i.e. we must by abstraction take from it the last mechanical characteristic which Lorentz had still left it.

Minkowski argued that Lorentz's introduction of the contraction hypothesis "sounds rather fantastical", since it is not the product of resistance in the aether but a "gift from above". He said that this hypothesis is "completely equivalent with the new concept of space and time", though it becomes much more comprehensible in the framework of the new spacetime geometry. (Note: Minkowski (1908)) However, Lorentz disagreed that it was "ad-hoc" and he argued in 1913 that there is little difference between his theory and the negation of a preferred reference frame, as in the theory of Einstein and Minkowski, so that it is a matter of taste which theory one prefers.

=== Mass–energy equivalence ===
It was derived by Einstein (1905) as a consequence of the relativity principle, that inertia of energy is actually represented by $E/c^2$, but in contrast to Poincaré's 1900-paper, Einstein recognized that matter itself loses or gains mass during the emission or absorption. (Note: Einstein (1905b)) So the mass of any form of matter is equal to a certain amount of energy, which can be converted into and re-converted from other forms of energy. This is the mass–energy equivalence, represented by $E=mc^2$. So Einstein didn't have to introduce "fictitious" masses and also avoided the perpetual motion problem, because according to Darrigol, (Note: Darrigol (2005), 18–21) Poincaré's radiation paradox can simply be solved by applying Einstein's equivalence. If the light source loses mass during the emission by $E/c^2$, the contradiction in the momentum law vanishes without the need of any compensating effect in the aether.

Similar to Poincaré, Einstein concluded in 1906 that the inertia of (electromagnetic) energy is a necessary condition for the center of mass theorem to hold in systems, in which electromagnetic fields and matter are acting on each other. Based on the mass–energy equivalence, he showed that emission and absorption of em-radiation, and therefore the transport of inertia, solves all problems. On that occasion, Einstein referred to Poincaré's 1900-paper and wrote: (Note: Einstein (1906))

Although the simple formal views, which must be accomplished for the proof of this statement, are already mainly contained in a work by H. Poincaré [Lorentz-Festschrift, p. 252, 1900], for the sake of clarity I won't rely on that work. (Note: German original: Trotzdem die einfachen formalen Betrachtungen, die zum Nachweis dieser Behauptung durchgeführt werden müssen, in der Hauptsache bereits in einer Arbeit von H. Poincaré enthalten sind [Lorentz-Festschrift, p. 252, 1900], werde ich mich doch der Übersichtlichkeit halber nicht auf jene Arbeit stützen.)

Also Poincaré's rejection of the reaction principle due to the violation of the mass conservation law can be avoided through Einstein's $E=mc^2$, because mass conservation appears as a special case of the energy conservation law.

=== General relativity ===
The attempts of Lorentz and Poincaré (and other attempts like those of Abraham and Gunnar Nordström) to formulate a theory of gravitation were superseded by Einstein's theory of general relativity. (Note: Walter 2007) This theory is based on principles like the equivalence principle, the general principle of relativity, the principle of general covariance, geodesic motion, local Lorentz covariance (the laws of special relativity apply locally for all inertial observers), and that spacetime curvature is created by stress-energy within the spacetime.

In 1920, Einstein compared Lorentz's aether with the "gravitational aether" of general relativity. He said that immobility is the only mechanical property of which the aether has not been deprived by Lorentz, but, contrary to the luminiferous and Lorentz's aether, the aether of general relativity has no mechanical property, not even immobility:

The aether of the general theory of relativity is a medium which is itself devoid of all mechanical and kinematical qualities, but which helps to determine mechanical (and electromagnetic) events. What is fundamentally new in the aether of the general theory of relativity, as opposed to the aether of Lorentz, consists in this, that the state of the former is at every place determined by connections with the matter and the state of the aether in neighbouring places, which are amenable to law in the form of differential equations; whereas the state of the Lorentzian aether in the absence of electromagnetic fields is conditioned by nothing outside itself, and is everywhere the same. The aether of the general theory of relativity is transmuted conceptually into the aether of Lorentz if we substitute constants for the functions of space which describe the former, disregarding the causes which condition its state. Thus we may also say, I think, that the aether of the general theory of relativity is the outcome of the Lorentzian aether, through relativization.

=== Priority ===
Some claim that Poincaré and Lorentz are the true founders of special relativity, not Einstein. For more details see the article on this dispute.

== Later activity ==
Viewed as a theory of elementary particles, Lorentz's electron/ether theory was superseded during the first few decades of the 20th century, first by quantum mechanics and then by quantum field theory. As a general theory of dynamics, Lorentz and Poincare had already (by about 1905) found it necessary to invoke the principle of relativity itself in order to make the theory match all the available empirical data. By this point, most vestiges of a substantial aether had been eliminated from Lorentz's "aether" theory, and it became both empirically and deductively equivalent to special relativity. The main difference was the metaphysical postulate of a unique absolute rest frame, which was empirically undetectable and played no role in the physical predictions of the theory, as Lorentz wrote in 1909, (Note: Lorentz 1909, p. 229: It will be clear by what has been said that the impressions received by the two observers A_{0} and A would be alike in all respects. It would be impossible to decide which of them moves or stands still with respect to the aether, and there would be no reason for preferring the times and lengths measured by the one to those determined by the other, nor for saying that either of them is in possession of the "true" times or the "true" lengths. This is a point which Einstein has laid particular stress on, in a theory in which he starts from what he calls the principle of relativity, i. e. the principle that the equations by means of which physical phenomena may be described are not altered in form when we change the axes of coordinates for others having a uniform motion of translation relatively to the original system. I cannot speak here of the many highly interesting applications which Einstein has made of this principle. His results concerning electromagnetic and optical phenomena (...) agree in the main with those which we have obtained in the preceding pages, the chief difference being that Einstein simply postulates what we have deduced, with some difficulty and not altogether satisfactorily, from the fundamental equations of the electromagnetic field. By doing so, he may certainly take credit for making us see in the negative result of experiments like those of Michelson, Rayleigh and Brace, not a fortuitous compensation of opposing effects, but the manifestation of a general and fundamental principle. Yet, I think, something may also be claimed in favour of the form in which I have presented the theory. I cannot but regard the aether, which can be the seat of an electromagnetic field with its energy and its vibrations, as endowed with a certain degree of substantiality, however different it may be from all ordinary matter. In this line of thought, it seems natural not to assume at starting that it can never make any difference whether a body moves through the aether or not, and to measure distances and lengths of time by means of rods and clocks having a fixed position relatively to the aether. It would be unjust not to add that, besides the fascinating boldness of its starting point, Einstein's theory has another marked advantage over mine. Whereas I have not been able to obtain for the equations referred to moving axes exactly the same form as for those which apply to a stationary system, Einstein has accomplished this by means of a system of new variables slightly different from those which I have introduced.) 1910 (published 1913), (Note: Lorentz 1913, p. 75: Provided that there is an aether, then under all systems x, y, z, t, one is preferred by the fact, that the coordinate axes as well as the clocks are resting in the aether. If one connects with this the idea (which I would abandon only reluctantly) that space and time are completely different things, and that there is a "true time" (simultaneity thus would be independent of the location, in agreement with the circumstance that we can have the idea of infinitely great velocities), then it can be easily seen that this true time should be indicated by clocks at rest in the aether. However, if the relativity principle had general validity in nature, one wouldn't be in the position to determine, whether the reference system just used is the preferred one. Then one comes to the same results, as if one (following Einstein and Minkowski) deny the existence of the aether and of true time, and to see all reference systems as equally valid. Which of these two ways of thinking one is following, can surely be left to the individual.) 1913 (published 1914), (Note: Lorentz 1914, p. 23: If the observers want to see the concept of time as something primary, something entirely separated from the concept of space, then they would certainly recognize that there is an absolute simultaneity; though they would leave it undecided, whether simultaneity is indicated by equal values of t, or by equal values of t′, or maybe neither by that or the other. Einstein said in a nutshell, that all of those mentioned questions have no meaning. Then he arrives at the "abandonment" of the aether. Incidentally, the latter is to a certain extent a quarrel about words: it makes no great difference whether one speaks about the vacuum or the aether. In any case, according to Einstein it has no meaning to speak about motion relative to the aether. He also denies the existence of absolute simultaneity. It is certainly remarkable that these relativity concepts, also with respect to time, have been incorporated so quickly. The evaluation of these concepts belongs largely to epistemology to which we can left the judgment, trusting that it can consider the discussed questions with the necessary thoroughness. But it is sure that for a large part it depends on the way of thinking to which one is accustomed, whether one feels attracted to the one view or the other. Regarding to the lecturer himself, he finds a certain satisfaction in the older views, that the aether has at least some substantiality, that space and time can be strictly separated, that one can speak about simultaneity without further specification. Regarding the latter, one can probably refer to the ability that arbitrary great velocities can at least imagined by us. By that, one comes very near to the concept of absolute simultaneity.) or in 1912 (published 1922). (Note: Lorentz 1922, p. 125: We thus have the choice between two different plans: we can adhere to the concept of an aether or else we can assume a true simultaneity. If one keeps strictly to the relativistic view that all systems are equivalent, one must give up the substantiality of the aether as well as the concept of a true time. The choice of the standpoint depends thus on very fundamental considerations, especially about the time. Of course, the description of natural phenomena and the testing of what the theory of relativity has to say about them can be carried out independently of what one thinks of the aether and the time. From a physical point of view these questions can be left on one side, and especially the question of the true time can be handed over to the theory of knowledge. The modern physicists, as Einstein and Minkowski, speak no longer about the aether at all. This, however, is a question of taste and of words. For, whether there is an aether or not, electromagnetic fields certainly exist, and so also does the energy of the electrical oscillations. If we do not like the name of "aether," we must use another word as a peg to hang all these things upon. It is not certain whether "space" can be so extended as to take care not only of the geometrical properties but also of the electric ones. One cannot deny to the bearer of these properties a certain substantiality, and if so, then one may, in all modesty, call true time the time measured by clocks which are fixed in this medium, and consider simultaneity as a primary concept.)

As a result, the term "Lorentz aether theory" is sometimes used today to refer to a neo-Lorentzian interpretation of special relativity. (Note: Balashov / Janssen, 2002) The prefix "neo" is used in recognition of the fact that the interpretation must now be applied to physical entities and processes (such as the standard model of quantum field theory) that were unknown in Lorentz's day.

Subsequent to the advent of special relativity, only a small number of individuals have advocated the Lorentzian approach to physics. Many of these, such as Herbert E. Ives (who, along with G. R. Stilwell, performed the first experimental confirmation of time dilation) have been motivated by the belief that special relativity is logically inconsistent, and so some other conceptual framework is needed to reconcile the relativistic phenomena. For example, Ives wrote "The 'principle' of the constancy of the velocity of light is not merely 'ununderstandable', it is not supported by 'objective matters of fact'; it is untenable...". (Note: Herbert E. Ives, "Revisions of the Lorentz Transformations", October 27, 1950) However, the logical consistency of special relativity (as well as its empirical success) is well established, so the views of such individuals are considered unfounded within the mainstream scientific community.

John Stewart Bell advocated teaching special relativity first from the viewpoint of a single Lorentz inertial frame, then showing that Poincare invariance of the laws of physics such as Maxwell's equations is equivalent to the frame-changing arguments often used in teaching special relativity. Because a single Lorentz inertial frame is one of a preferred class of frames, he called this approach Lorentzian in spirit. (Note: J. Bell, How to Teach Special Relativity)

Also some test theories of special relativity use some sort of Lorentzian framework. For instance, the Robertson–Mansouri–Sexl test theory introduces a preferred aether frame and includes parameters indicating different combinations of length and times changes. If time dilation and length contraction of bodies moving in the aether have their exact relativistic values, the complete Lorentz transformation can be derived and the aether is hidden from any observation, which makes it kinematically indistinguishable from the predictions of special relativity. Using this model, the Michelson–Morley experiment, Kennedy–Thorndike experiment, and Ives–Stilwell experiment put sharp constraints on violations of Lorentz invariance.
