= Theodor des Coudres =

German physicist

Theodor des Coudres (13 March 1862 in Veckerhagen, Weser – 8 October 1926 in Leipzig) was a German physicist.

Theodor des Coudres was the son of Julius des Coudres and his wife Anna Henrietta Rosenstock. His younger brother, Richard des Coudres, later became president of the "Mitteldeutschen Sängerbundes" (Central German singer federation); his uncle on the paternal side was the painter Ludwig des Coudres.

In 1881 des Coudres began to study natural science and medicine at the University of Geneva and later in Leipzig and Munich. At the Humboldt University of Berlin in 1887, he successfully finished his study with a thesis on the optical constants of mercury with Professor Hermann von Helmholtz. 1889 he was employed at the University of Leipzig as an assistant of Professor Gustav Heinrich Wiedemann. His research led him to his Habilitation in 1891. 1895 he was appointed to the University of Göttingen at the chair for "applied electricity". In 1901 he went to the University of Würzburg and took over the chair for theoretical physics as an extraordinary professor. In 1903 he became the successor of Professor Ludwig Boltzmann at the University of Leipzig, where he worked until the end of his life.

Sometimes he suffered from an enormous writer's block and could handle this problem only during long trips by railway. Theodor des Coudres died in Leipzig on 8 October 1926 at the age of 64 years. The publisher Georg Hirzel and the physicist Otto Wiener wrote noteworthy obituaries on Theodor des Coudres.

Des Coudres worked among other things on metal reflection, the Kerr effect, high pressure physics, and he was the first to determine the specific charge and the speed of alpha particles.

== See also ==
- Gravitational aether drag
