= Fizeau experiment =

Experiment measuring the speed of light in moving water

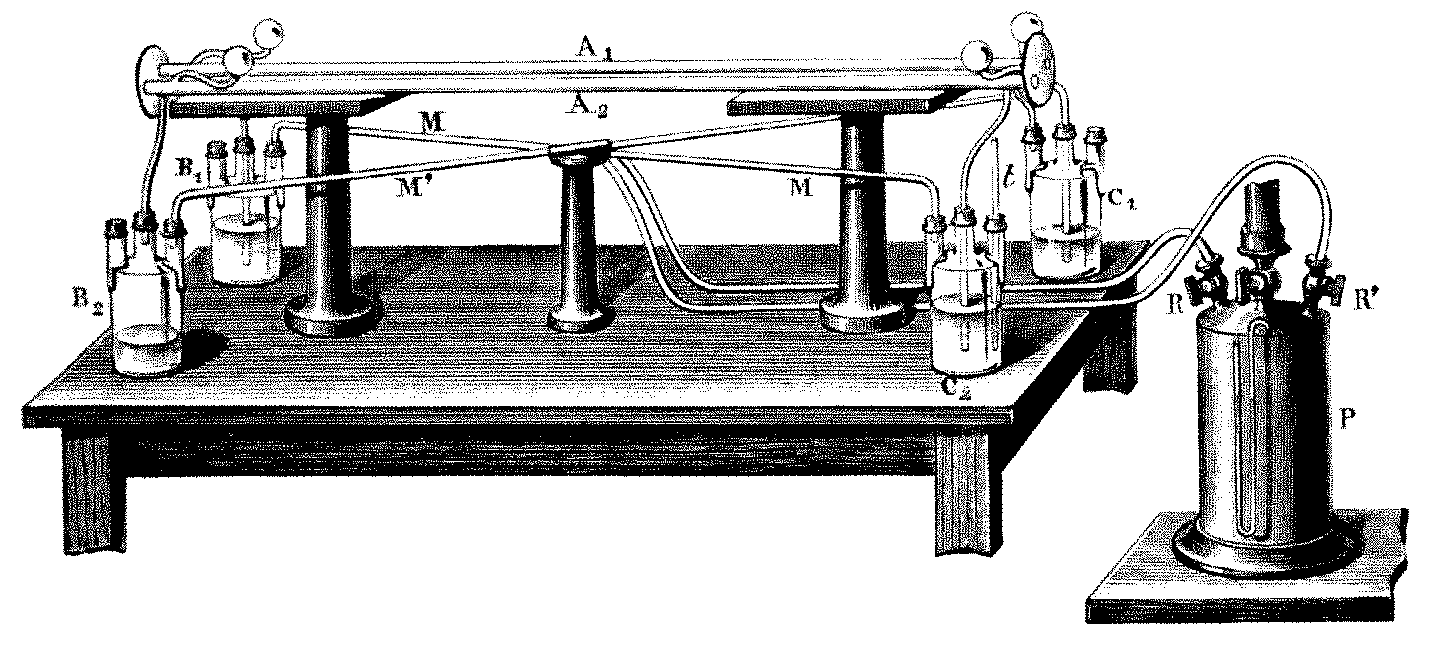
Figure 1. Apparatus used in the Fizeau experiment

The Fizeau experiment was carried out by Hippolyte Fizeau in 1851 to measure the relative speeds of light in moving water. Fizeau used a special interferometer arrangement to measure the effect of movement of a medium upon the speed of light.

According to the theories prevailing at the time, light traveling through a moving medium would be dragged along by the medium, so that the measured speed of the light would be a simple sum of its speed through the medium plus the speed of the medium. Fizeau indeed detected a dragging effect, but the magnitude of the effect that he observed was far lower than expected. When he repeated the experiment with air in place of water he observed no effect. His results were inconsistent with the mainstream physics of the time and seemingly supported the partial aether-drag hypothesis of Augustin-Jean Fresnel. Over half a century passed before a satisfactory explanation of Fizeau's unexpected measurement was developed with the advent of Albert Einstein's theory of special relativity. Einstein later pointed out the importance of the experiment for special relativity, in which it corresponds to the relativistic velocity-addition formula when restricted to small velocities.

Although it is referred to as the Fizeau experiment, Fizeau was an active experimenter who carried out a wide variety of different experiments involving measuring the speed of light in various situations.

== Background ==
As scientists in the 1700s worked on a theory of light and of electromagnetism, luminiferous aether, a medium that would support waves, was the focus of many experiments. Two critical issues were the relation of aether to motion and its relation to matter. For example, astronomical aberration, the apparent motion of stars observed at different times of year, was proposed to be related to starlight propagated through an aether. In 1846 Fresnel proposed that the portion of aether that will move with an object relates to the object's index of refraction of light, which was taken to be the ratio of the speed of light in the material to the speed of light in interstellar space. Having recently measured the speed of light in air and water, Fizeau set out to measure the speed of light in moving water.

== Experimental setup ==
Figure 2. Highly simplified representation of Fizeau's experiment.

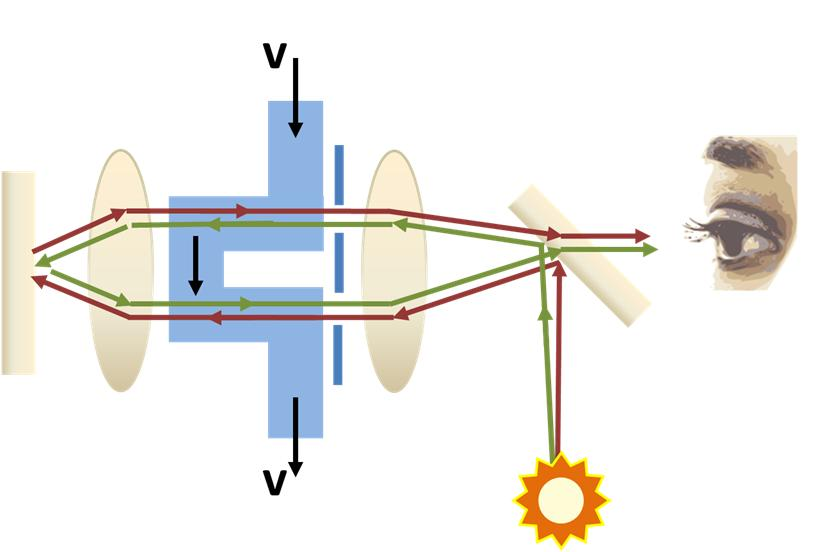
Figure 3. Interferometer setup in the Fizeau Experiment (1851)

A highly simplified representation of Fizeau's 1851 experiment is presented in Fig. 2. Incoming light is split into two beams by a beam splitter (BS) and passed through two columns of water flowing in opposite directions. The two beams are then recombined to form an interference pattern that can be interpreted by an observer.

The simplified arrangement illustrated in Fig. 2 would have required the use of monochromatic light, which would have enabled only dim fringes. Because of white light's short coherence length, use of white light would have required matching up the optical paths to an impractical degree of precision, and the apparatus would have been extremely sensitive to vibration, motion shifts, and temperature effects.

Fizeau's actual apparatus, illustrated in Fig. 3 and Fig. 4, was set up as a common-path interferometer. This guaranteed that the opposite beams would pass through equivalent paths, so that fringes readily formed even when using the sun as a light source.

The double transit of the light was for the purpose of augmenting the distance traversed in the medium in motion, and further to compensate entirely any accidental difference of temperature or pressure between the two tubes, from which might result a displacement of the fringes, which would be mingled with the displacement which the motion alone would have produced; and thus have rendered the observation of it uncertain. (Note: Fizeau, H. (1851). "Sur les hypothèses relatives à l'éther lumineux". Comptes Rendus. 33: 349–355. English: Fizeau, H. (1851). "The Hypotheses Relating to the Luminous Aether, and an Experiment which Appears to Demonstrate that the Motion of Bodies Alters the Velocity with which Light Propagates itself in their Interior" . Philosophical Magazine. 2: 568–573.)

— Fizeau

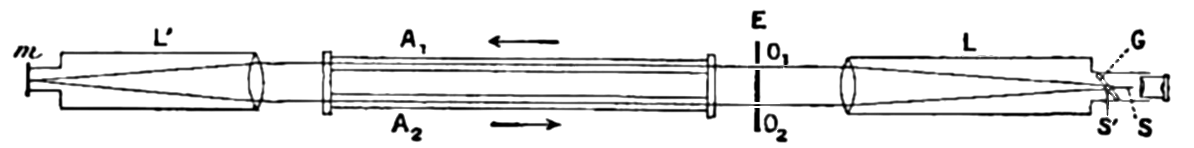
Figure 4. Setup of the Fizeau Experiment (1851)

A light ray emanating from the source S′ is reflected by a beam splitter G and is collimated into a parallel beam by lens L. After passing the slits O_{1} and O_{2}, two rays of light travel through the tubes A_{1} and A_{2}, through which water is streaming back and forth as shown by the arrows. The rays reflect off a mirror m at the focus of lens L′, so that one ray always propagates in the same direction as the water stream, and the other ray opposite to the direction of the water stream. After passing back and forth through the tubes, both rays unite at S, where they produce interference fringes that can be visualized through the illustrated eyepiece. The interference pattern can be analyzed to determine the speed of light traveling along each leg of the tube. (Note: Fizeau, H. (1859). "Sur les hypothèses relatives à l'éther lumineux". Ann. Chim. Phys. 57: 385–404. English: Fizeau, H. (1860). "On the Effect of the Motion of a Body upon the Velocity with which it is traversed by Light" . Philosophical Magazine. 19: 245–260.)

== Result ==
Fizeau's experiment showed a faster speed of light in water moving in the same direction and a slower speed when the water moved opposite the light. However the amount of difference in the speed of light was only a fraction of the water speed. Interpreted in terms of the aether theory, the water seemed to drag the aether and thus the light propagation, but only partially.

== Impact ==
At the time of Fizeau's experiment, two different models of how aether related to moving bodies were discussed, Fresnel's partial drag hypothesis and George Stokes' complete aether drag hypothesis. Augustin-Jean Fresnel (1818) had proposed his model to explain an 1810 experiment by Arago. In 1845 Stokes showed that complete aether drag could also explain it. Since Fresnel had no model to explain partial drag, scientists favored Stokes' explanation.

According to the Stokes hypothesis, the speed of light should be increased or decreased when "dragged" along by the water through the aether frame, dependent upon the direction. The overall speed of a beam of light should be a simple additive sum of its speed through the water plus the speed of the water. That is, if n is the index of refraction of water, so that c/n is the speed of light in stationary water, then the predicted speed of light w in one arm would be

$$w_+=\frac{c}{n}+v \ ,$$

and the predicted speed in the other arm would be

$$w_-=\frac{c}{n} - v \ ,$$

for water with velocity $v$. Hence light traveling against the flow of water should be slower than light traveling with the flow of water. The interference pattern between the two beams when the light is recombined at the observer depends upon the transit times over the two paths.

However Fizeau found that:

$$w_+=\frac{c}{n}+ v\left(1-\frac{1}{n^2}\right) \ .$$

In other words, light appeared to be dragged by the water, but the magnitude of the dragging was much lower than expected.

The Fizeau experiment forced physicists to accept the empirical validity of Fresnel's model, that a medium moving through the stationary aether drags light propagating through it with only a fraction of the medium's speed, with a dragging coefficient f related to the index of refraction:

$$f = 1-\frac{1}{n^2} \ .$$

Although Fresnel's hypothesis was empirically successful in explaining Fizeau's results, many experts in the field, including Fizeau himself, found Fresnel's hypothesis partial aether-dragging unsatisfactory. Fresnel had found an empirical formula that worked but no mechanical model of the aether was used to derive it.

== Confirmation ==
=== Wilhelm Veltmann's colors of light ===
In 1870 Wilhelm Veltmann demonstrated that Fresnel's formula worked for different frequencies (colors) of light. According to Fresnel's model this would imply different amounts of aether drag for different colors of light. The velocity with white light, a mixture of colors, would be unexplained.

=== Hoek experiment ===
An indirect confirmation of Fresnel's dragging coefficient was provided by Martin Hoek (1868). His apparatus was similar to Fizeau's, though in his version only one arm contained an area filled with resting water, while the other arm was in the air. As seen by an observer resting in the aether, Earth and hence the water is in motion. So the following travel times of two light rays traveling in opposite directions were calculated by Hoek (neglecting the transverse direction, see image):

$t_{1}=\frac{AB}{c+v}+\frac{DE}{\frac{c}{n}-v} \ ,$

$t_{2}=\frac{AB}{c-v}+\frac{DE}{\frac{c}{n}+v} \ .$

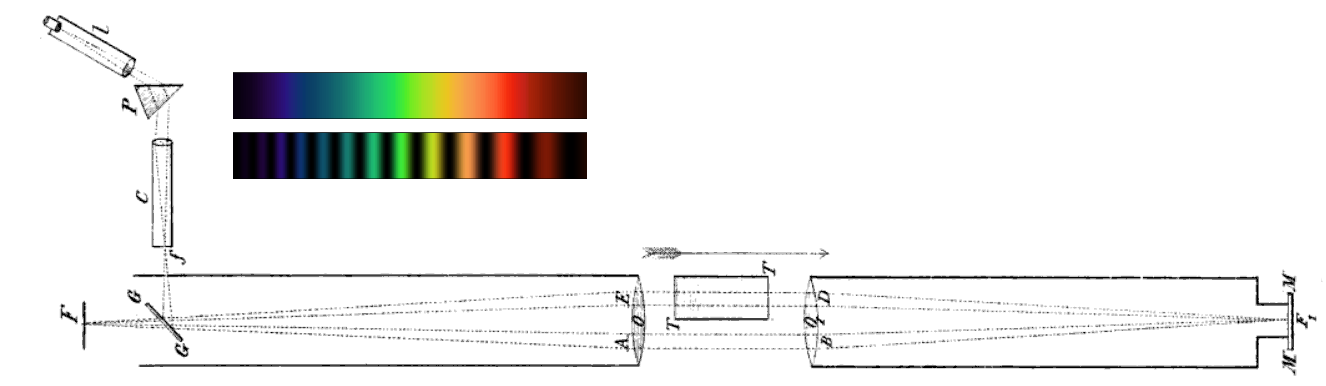
Figure 6. Hoek expected the observed spectrum to be continuous with the apparatus oriented transversely to the aether wind, and to be banded with the apparatus oriented parallel to the wind. In the actual experiment, he observed no banding regardless of the instrument's orientation.

The travel times are not the same, which should be indicated by an interference shift. However, if Fresnel's dragging coefficient is applied to the water in the aether frame, the travel time difference (to first order in v/c) vanishes. Upon turning the apparatus table 180 degrees, altering the direction of a hypothetical aether wind, Hoek obtained a null result, confirming Fresnel's dragging coefficient.

In the particular version of the experiment shown here, Hoek used a prism P to disperse light from a slit into a spectrum which passed through a collimator C before entering the apparatus. With the apparatus oriented parallel to the hypothetical aether wind, Hoek expected the light in one circuit to be retarded 7/600 mm with respect to the other. Where this retardation represented an integral number of wavelengths, he expected to see constructive interference; where this retardation represented a half-integral number of wavelengths, he expected to see destructive interference. In the absence of dragging, his expectation was for the observed spectrum to be continuous with the apparatus oriented transversely to the aether wind, and to be banded with the apparatus oriented parallel to the aether wind. His actual experimental results were completely negative.

=== Mascart's birefringence experiment ===
Éleuthère Mascart (1872) demonstrated a result for polarized light traveling through a birefringent medium gives different velocities in accordance with Fresnel's empirical formula. However, the result in terms of Fresnel's physical model requires different aether drag in different direction in the medium.

=== Michelson and Morley confirmation ===
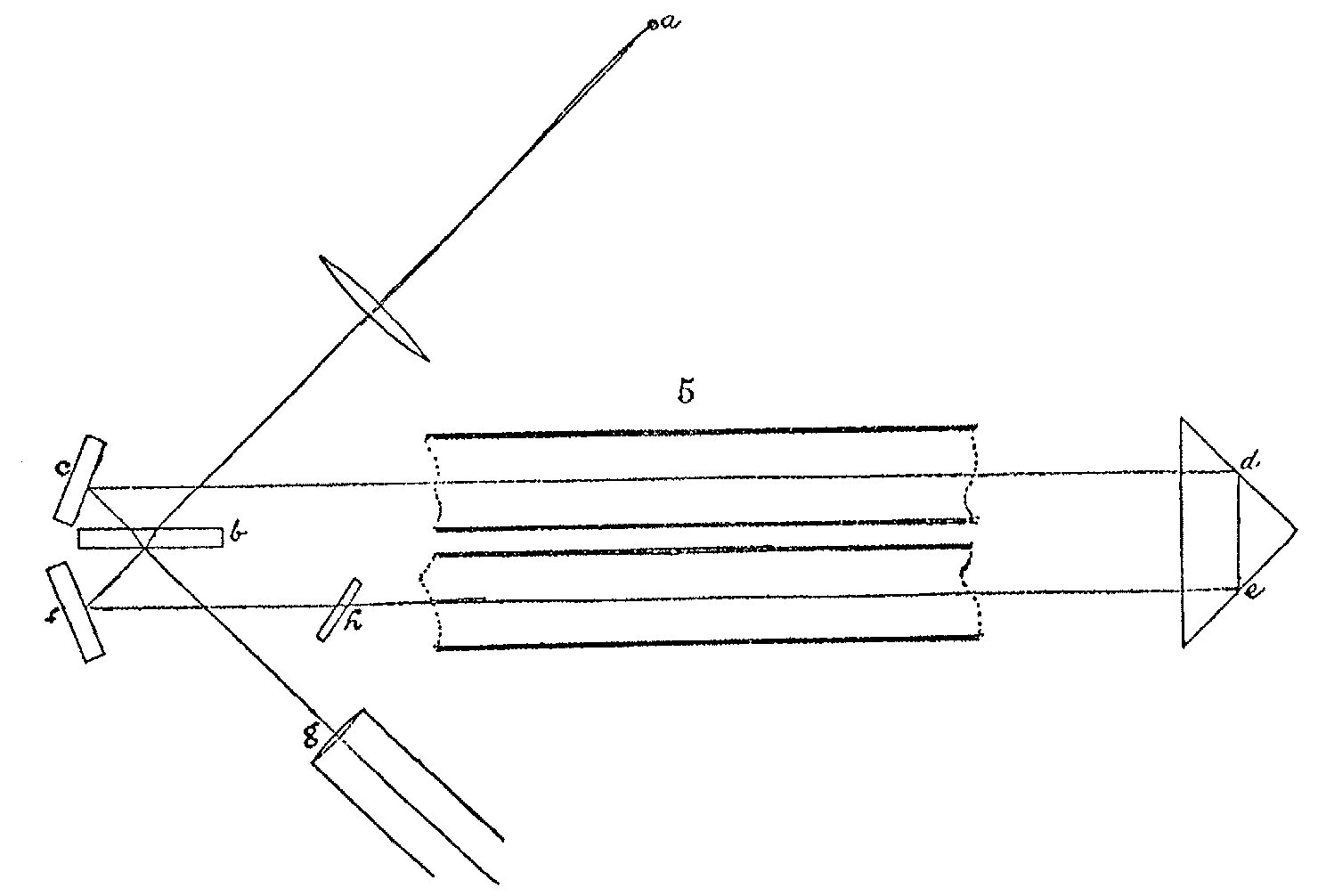
Figure 5. Improved Fizeau type experiment by Michelson and Morley in 1886. Collimated light from source a falls on beam splitter b where it divides: one part follows the path b c d e f b g and the other the path b f e d c b g.

Albert A. Michelson and Edward W. Morley (1886) repeated Fizeau's experiment with improved accuracy, addressing several concerns with Fizeau's original experiment: (1) Deformation of the optical components in Fizeau's apparatus could cause artifactual fringe displacement; (2) observations were rushed, since the pressurized flow of water lasted only a short time; (3) the laminar flow profile of water flowing through Fizeau's small diameter tubes meant that only their central portions were available, resulting in faint fringes; (4) there were uncertainties in Fizeau's determination of flow rate across the diameter of the tubes. Michelson redesigned Fizeau's apparatus with larger diameter tubes and a large reservoir providing three minutes of steady water flow. His common-path interferometer design provided automatic compensation of path length, so that white light fringes were visible at once as soon as the optical elements were aligned. Topologically, the light path was that of a Sagnac interferometer with an even number of reflections in each light path. This offered extremely stable fringes that were, to first order, completely insensitive to any movement of its optical components. The stability was such that it was possible for him to insert a glass plate at h or even to hold a lighted match in the light path without displacing the center of the fringe system. Using this apparatus, Michelson and Morley were able to completely confirm Fizeau's results not just in water, but also in air.

=== Zeeman and Lorentz's improved formula ===
In 1895, Hendrik Lorentz predicted the existence of an extra term due to dispersion:

$$w_+ = \frac {c}{n} + v \left(1 - \frac{1}{n^2} - \frac{\lambda}{n} \! \cdot \! \frac{ \mathrm{d} n }{ \mathrm{d} \lambda } \right) \ .$$

Since the medium is flowing towards or away from the observer, the light traveling through the medium is Doppler-shifted, and the refractive index used in the formula has to be that appropriate to the Doppler-shifted wavelength. Zeeman verified the existence of Lorentz' dispersion term in 1915. Using a scaled-up version of Michelson's apparatus connected directly to Amsterdam's main water conduit, Zeeman was able to perform extended measurements using monochromatic light ranging from violet (4358 Å) through red (6870 Å) to confirm Lorentz's modified coefficient.

=== Later confirmations ===
In 1910, Franz Harress used a rotating device and overall confirmed Fresnel's dragging coefficient. However, he additionally found a "systematic bias" in the data, which later turned out to be the Sagnac effect.

Since then, many experiments have been conducted measuring such dragging coefficients in a diversity of materials of differing refractive index, often in combination with the Sagnac effect. (Note: Stedman, G. E. (1997). "Ring-laser tests of fundamental physics and geophysics". Reports on Progress in Physics. 60 (6): 615–688. Bibcode:1997RPPh...60..615S. doi:10.1088/0034-4885/60/6/001. S2CID 1968825.; see pp. 631–634, and references therein.) For instance, in experiments using ring lasers together with rotating disks, or in neutron interferometric experiments. Also a transverse dragging effect was observed, i.e. when the medium is moving at right angles to the direction of the incident light.

== Lorentz's interpretation ==
In 1892, Hendrik Lorentz proposed a modification of Fresnel's model, in which the aether is completely stationary. He succeeded in deriving Fresnel's dragging coefficient as the result of an interaction between the moving water with an undragged aether. He also discovered that the transition from one to another reference frame could be simplified by using an auxiliary time variable which he called local time:

$$t^{\prime}=t-\frac{vx}{c^{2}} \ .$$

In 1895, Lorentz more generally explained Fresnel's coefficient based on the concept of local time. However, Lorentz's theory had the same fundamental problem as Fresnel's: a stationary aether contradicted the Michelson–Morley experiment. So in 1892 Lorentz proposed that moving bodies contract in the direction of motion (FitzGerald-Lorentz contraction hypothesis, since George FitzGerald had already arrived in 1889 at this conclusion). The equations that he used to describe these effects were further developed by him until 1904. These are now called the Lorentz transformations in his honor, and are identical in form to the equations that Einstein was later to derive from first principles. Unlike Einstein's equations, however, Lorentz's transformations were strictly ad hoc, their only justification being that they seemed to work.

== Einstein's use of Fizeau's experiment ==
Einstein showed how Lorentz's equations could be derived as the logical outcome of a set of two simple starting postulates. In addition Einstein recognized that the stationary aether concept has no place in special relativity, and that the Lorentz transformation concerns the nature of space and time. Together with the moving magnet and conductor problem, the negative aether drift experiments, and the aberration of light, the Fizeau experiment was one of the key experimental results that shaped Einstein's thinking about relativity. Robert S. Shankland reported some conversations with Einstein, in which Einstein emphasized the importance of the Fizeau experiment:

He continued to say the experimental results which had influenced him most were the observations of stellar aberration and Fizeau's measurements on the speed of light in moving water. "They were enough," he said.

== Modern interpretation ==
Max von Laue (1907) demonstrated that the Fresnel drag coefficient can be explained as a natural consequence of the relativistic formula for addition of velocities. The speed of light in immobile water is c/n. From the velocity composition law it follows that the speed of light observed in the laboratory, where water is flowing with speed v (in the same direction as light) is
$$V_\mathrm{lab}=\frac{\frac{c}{n}+v}{1+\frac{\frac{c}{n}v}{c^2}}=\frac{\frac{c}{n}+v}{1+\frac{v}{cn}} \ .$$
Thus the difference in speed is (assuming v is small comparing to c, dropping higher order terms)
$$V_\mathrm{lab}-\frac{c}{n} = \frac{\frac{c}{n}+v}{1+\frac{v}{cn}}-\frac{c}{n}=\frac{\frac{c}{n}+v-\frac{c}{n}(1+\frac{v}{cn})}{1+\frac{v}{cn}}$$
$$= \frac{v\left(1-\frac{1}{n^2}\right)}{1+\frac{v}{cn}}\approx v\left(1-\frac{1}{n^2}\right) \ .$$
This is accurate when v/c ≪ 1, and agrees with the formula based upon Fizeau's measurements, which satisfied the condition v/c ≪ 1.

Alternatively, the Fizeau result can be derived by applying Maxwell's equations to a moving medium.

== See also ==
- Tests of special relativity
- Aether drag hypothesis
- History of special relativity
