= Gustaf Wilhelm Hammar =

American physicist (1893–1954)

Gustaf Wilhelm Hammar (Gustav Vilhelm Hammar) (June 22, 1893 – August 19, 1954) was a Swedish-born American experimental physicist. He was the eldest of six children of Anders Vilhelm Hammar and Elin Christina Hammar (née Olsson). He emigrated to the United States in 1913, attended Bethel University in St. Paul, Minnesota, and by 1920 was married and living with his wife, Louise (with whom he was ultimately to have four children), in King County, Washington.

He obtained his M.S. degree at the University of Idaho in 1924 and a Ph.D. from the California Institute of Technology in 1927. His Ph.D. dissertation topic was titled "Magnetic Susceptibilities of Some Common Gases."

He returned to the University of Idaho in 1926 to teach, and became the head of the physics department in 1930, a position that he held for sixteen years. He led a productive materials science laboratory and was mindful of practical applications of his research—for example, as an extension of his researches in photoelectricity, he and his student Lawrence W. Foskett developed a telephone using light instead of copper wire for transmitting signals. At present, however, Hammar is best remembered for an experiment that was quite outside of his main area of research, the Hammar experiment, a test of the validity of special relativity.

In 1946, he joined the Eastman Kodak Company as a senior supervising physicist with the Navy Ordnance Division. During this period with Kodak, he worked on various military projects. He developed infrared photosensitive cells for use in night-vision gun sights, and time-delayed fuses for use in unattended firearms intended to mislead the enemy into believing that large forces of men are concentrated in areas where they actually are not (patents 2547820, 2601135, 2917413, 2958802, 3063862, 3067330). In 1953, he was honored for his research in physics with fellowship in the American Physical Society.
