= Werner S. Weiglhofer =

Werner Siegfried Weiglhofer
- Weiglhofer c. 2002
- Born: 25 August 1962; Bruck an der Mur, Austria
- Died: 12 January 2003 (aged 40); Trollstigen, Norway
- Education: Graz University of Technology
- Scientific career
- Fields: Applied mathematics; Physics
- Workplaces: University of Adelaide; University of Glasgow
- Thesis: The representation of electromagnetic fields in anisotropic media in terms of dyadic Green’s functions (1986)
- Doctoral advisor: Walter Papousek

Werner Siegfried Weiglhofer (25 August 1962 — 12 January 2003) was an Austrian applied mathematician, physicist, engineer and mountaineer, who was a professor at the Department of Mathematics at University of Glasgow. He was best known for his contributions to the electromagnetic theory of complex materials.

== Biography ==
Werner Siegfried Weiglhofer was born in Bruck an der Mur on 25 August 1962. He obtained his doctorate in technical sciences from Graz University of Technology in 1986; his doctoral studies focused on scalar Hertz potentials in anisotropic materials. Following his post-doctoral studies at University of Adelaide on the basis of an Australian-European Fellowship, he joined the Department of Mathematics at University of Glasgow as a research assistant in 1988, working on magnetohydrodynamics. Becoming a lecturer at the department in 1991, he eventually was tenured as a professor in 2002.

Weiglhofer's main research interests were magnetohydrodynamics and electrodynamics of complex materials, such as chiral and bi-anisotropic media. His research career was marked with extensive collaborations with Akhlesh Lakhtakia. During his research career, he authored or co-authored 135 research publications in peer-reviewed journals, as well as an undergraduate textbook on ordinary differential equations. He has served on the editorial boards of the journals AEU: International Journal of Electronics and Communications and Electromagnetics, and was the recipient of multiple URSI Young Scientists awards, as well as a research fellowship from Royal Society of Edinburgh. In 1997, he organized the Bianisotropics '97 conference in University of Glasgow.

Weiglhofer had an avid interest in mountaineering and snowshoeing, and climbed to all of the Munros in Scotland. From 1991 onwards, he has travelled extensively to Romsdal for mountain climbing and published two guidebooks to its peaks. Having learnt Norwegian language, he contributed to local newspapers on mountaineering-related topics. On 12 January 2003, he died in an avalanche at Bispen mountain in Trollstigen, Norway. By the time of his death, he was co-editing the monograph Introduction to Complex Mediums for Optics and Electromagnetics, which was released in the same year posthumously. A conference in honour of Weiglhofer, titled Weiglhofer Symposium on Electromagnetic Theory, was first held in July 2022 in University of Edinburgh; it was organized by Akhlesh Lakhtakia and Weiglhofer's only doctoral student, Tom G. Mackay.

== Selected publications ==
Books

- Weiglhofer, W. S., ed. (1997). Proceedings of Bianisotropics'97, International Conference and Workshop on Electromagnetics of Complex Media. Glasgow, Great Britain.
- Weiglhofer, W. S.; Lindsay, K. A. (1999). Ordinary Differential Equations & Applications: Mathematical Methods for Applied Mathematicians, Physicists, Engineers, Bioscientists. Chichester, England: Horwood Publishing Limited.
- Weiglhofer, Werner S. (1999). The summits of the Romsdal Alps = Toppene av Romsdalsalpene. Glasgow, Scotland: University of Glasgow.
- Lakhtakia, A.; Weiglhofer, W. S.; Messier, R., eds. (2000). Complex Mediums. SPIE International symposium on optical science, engineering, and instrumentation. Vol. 4097. San Diego, California, USA: SPIE.
- Lakhtakia, A.; Weiglhofer, W. S.; Hodgkinson, I. J., eds. (2001). Complex Mediums II: Beyond Linear Isotropic Dielectrics. SPIE International symposium on optical science and technology. Vol. 4467. San Diego, California, USA: SPIE.
- Weiglhofer, W. S.; Lakhtakia, A., eds. (2003). Introduction to Complex Mediums for Optics and Electromagnetics. Bellingham, WA: SPIE Press.

Journal articles

- Weiglhofer, Werner S. (November–December 1993). "Analytic methods and free-space dyadic Green's functions". Radio Science. 28 (6): 847–857. doi:10.1029/93RS00903.
- Weiglhofer, W. S.; Lakhtakia, A. (1993). "Electromagnetic wave propagation in super-cholesteric materials parallel to the helical axis". Journal of Physics D: Applied Physics. 26 (12): 2117–2122. doi:10.1088/0022-3727/26/12/004.
- Lakhtakia, Akhlesh; Weiglhofer, Werner S. (1995). "On light propagation in helicoidal bianisotropic mediums". Proceedings of the Royal Society of London. Series A: Mathematical, Physical and Engineering Sciences. 448 (1934): 419–437. doi:10.1098/rspa.1995.0025.
- Weiglhofer, Werner S.; Lakhtakia, Akhlesh (1997). "On the non-existence of linear non-reciprocal bi-isotropic (NRBI) media". Journal of Physics A: Mathematical and General. 30 (7): 2597–2600. doi:10.1088/0305-4470/30/7/035.
- Mackay, Tom G.; Lakhtakia, Akhlesh; Weiglhofer, Werner S. (2000). "Strong-property-fluctuation theory for homogenization of bianisotropic composites: Formulation". Physical Review E. 62 (5): 6052–6064. doi:10.1103/PhysRevE.62.6052.
- Mackay, Tom G.; Lakhtakia, Akhlesh; Weiglhofer, Werner S. (2001). "Homogenisation of similarly oriented, metallic, ellipsoidal inclusions using the bilocally-approximated strong-property-fluctuation theory". Optics Communications. 197 (1–3): 89–95. doi:10.1016/S0030-4018(01)01433-X.
- McCall, Martin W.; Lakhtakia, Akhlesh; Weiglhofer, Werner S. (2002). "The negative index of refraction demystified". European Journal of Physics. 23 (3): 353–359. arXiv:physics/0204067. doi:10.1088/0143-0807/23/3/314.
