= Emission theory =

Emission theory may refer to:

- Emission theory (relativity), a former competing theory for the special theory of relativity
- Emission theory (vision), a former competing theory for visual perception
