= The Light (Glass) =

1987 composition by Philip Glass

The Light is a 1987 composition by Philip Glass, his first score for a full symphony orchestra. The work was commissioned for the Michelson-Morley Centennial Celebration held at Case Western Reserve University. The musical structure is inspired by the 1887 Michelson–Morley experiment, an investigation of the speed of light that marked a turning point in modern science.

An excerpt of The Light plays in the 2022 documentary Moonage Daydream.
