= Daniel Frost Comstock =

American physicist and engineer

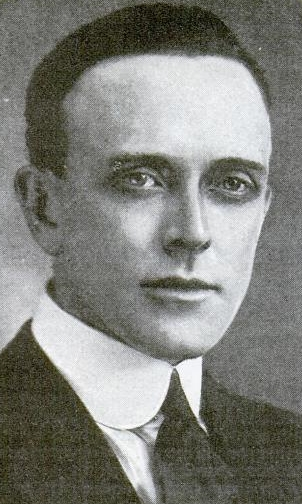
Daniel Frost Comstock

Daniel Frost Comstock (/ˈkɒmstɒk/; August 14, 1883 – March 2, 1970) was an American physicist and engineer.

== Biography ==
Comstock attained a B.S. from the Massachusetts Institute of Technology in 1904. He also studied in Berlin, Zürich, and Basel, where he attained his Ph.D. in 1906. At the University of Cambridge (1906–1907) he studied under J. J. Thomson. Beginning in 1904 he was a member of the faculty at MIT in theoretical physics (assistant professor 1910–1915; associate professor 1915–1917).

Comstock is most well known as the co-founder of the company Kalmus, Comstock & Westcott, and of Technicolor Motion Picture Corporation, which developed the second major color film process, after Britain's Kinemacolor, and the most widely used color motion picture process in Hollywood from 1922 to 1952.

Comstock also published some theoretical papers in the fields of electrodynamics (1908), special relativity (1910a) (see History of special relativity), and emission theory (1910b).

== Publications ==
- Comstock, D.F. (1908), "The Relation of Mass to Energy", Philosophical Magazine, 6, 15 (85): 1–21, doi:10.1080/14786440809463743
- —— (1910), "The Principle of Relativity", Science, 31 (803): 767–772, Bibcode:1910Sci....31..767C, doi:10.1126/science.31.803.767, PMID 17758464
- —— (1910), "A Neglected Type of Relativity" , Phys. Rev., 30 (2): 267, Bibcode:1910PhRvI..30..262., doi:10.1103/PhysRevSeriesI.30.262
- ——; Troland, L.T. (1917), The nature of matter and electricity : an outline of modern views, New York: D. Van Nostrand

== See also ==
- de Sitter double star experiment
- Relativity of simultaneity
