= Fringe shift =

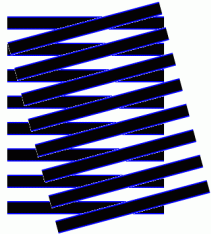
Two plane waves viewed from above. Black/Blue lines represent wave peaks. White spaces between lines represent troughs. Yellow areas produce bright lines of constructive interference. The dark areas produce dark lines of destructive interference.

In interferometry experiments such as the Michelson–Morley experiment, a fringe shift is the behavior of a pattern of “fringes” when the phase relationship between the component sources change.

A fringe pattern can be created in a number of ways but the stable fringe pattern found in the Michelson type interferometers is caused by the separation of the original source into two separate beams and then recombining them at differing angles of incidence on a viewing surface.

The interaction of the waves on a viewing surface alternates between constructive interference and destructive interference causing alternating lines of dark and light. In the example of a Michelson Interferometer, a single fringe represents one wavelength of the source light and is measured from the center of one bright line to the center of the next. The physical width of a fringe is governed by the difference in the angles of incidence of the component beams of light, but regardless of a fringe's physical width, it still represents a single wavelength of light.

== Historical Context ==
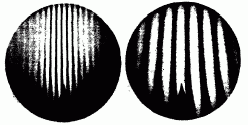
Actual photo of fringes seen in an old michelson-type interferometer. This animation shows the angled beam's phase moving ahead of the reference beams causing a constant fringe shift to the left.

In the 1887 Michelson–Morley experiment, the round trip distance that the two beams traveled down the precisely equal arms was expected to be made unequal because of the, now deprecated, idea that light is constrained to travel as a mechanical wave at the speed C only in the rest frame of the luminiferous aether.

The Earth's presumed motion through that frame was believed to cause a local aether "wind" in the moving frame of the interferometer like a car passing through still air creates an apparent wind for those inside. It is crucial to avoid the Historian's fallacy and note that these experimenters did not expect that a mechanical wave would travel varying speeds within a homogenous isotropic medium of aether. Waves have been studied since antiquity and mathematically at least since Jean le Rond d'Alembert in the 1700s. Our modern understanding of the constancy of light, however, grants the additional, new, "non-mechanical," categorization of waves and subsequent new 4D behavior for electromagnetic waves that radically alters the interpretation of what the Michelson-Morley experiment actually measures. It was only since the work of Einstein and Minkowski that waves of a non-mechanical nature were conceived of and electromagnetic waves are no longer considered mechanical, therefore the experiment's interpretation is changed for modern sources. We now believe it to compare the speed of light in different directions instead of the path length difference expected by Michelson and the aether theorists of the time.

If, now, the apparatus be revolved through 90° so that the second pencil is brought into the direction of the earth's motion, its path will have lengthened ${\displaystyle {\tfrac {4}{100}}}$ wave-lengths

== Distance vs speed expectations ==
Contrary to modern understanding of this experiment, they did not expect it to measure the speed of light, but alterations of the supposedly "true" additional distances of light's travel and therefore only "apparent" measured speeds. In the mechanical wave system presumed for light's behavior which was contemporary with the experiment, Earth's movement would cause the waves directed into the wind to have to "catch up" to the leading mirror which, in the aether frame, would be escaping directly away from initial position of the light source, but the light would merely move "across" the wind along the arms perpendicular to the experiment's motion and would be less affected.

Thus, like water waves constrained to move in the frame of the water moving past an observer rowing a boat, the presumed mechanical waves of light in the aether would have to "traverse more aether" to keep up with the moving experiment. IE waves travel greater distance in the aether frame to "catch up" to the moving experiment and observer. In the frame of the moving experiment this should result in a time-of-arrival difference that causes a change to phase alignment.

In the frame of the (presumed) moving interferometer, the measured equality of the space between the mirrors combined with a difference in arrival time would also appear to indicate a difference in light's speed which is now the current understanding. Under the modern relativistic explanation the "apparent speed difference" of the aether explanation could only be a real difference in speed, thus we now expect the experiment to always be null. The Michelson-Morley is, therefore, a two-way speed of light experiment in the context of the modern perspective and Special relativity which now replaces the mechanical "aether-wave" understanding of light that was contemporary with the experiment.

== Results ==
While in a modern context this experiment is assumed to only measure speed, the mechanical wave theory of the time expected a fringe shift to match the "additional path length." It was calculated to result in a offset arrival time at the detector and a phase shift of 0.4 wavelengths. This means that as the interferometer's arms were spun to face into and against the aether wind, the vertical fringe lines should have moved across the viewer 0.4 fringe widths left and right for a total of 0.8 fringes from maximum to minimum. Michelson reported that if there were any shift, it was certainly less than one twentieth, and probably less than a fortieth of the expected effect, which corresponds to a velocity of the ether with respect to Earth certainly less than one fourth, and probably less than one sixth, of the speed of Earth's orbital motion.

== See also ==
- Interference
- Interferometer
- Beat (acoustics)
- Moiré pattern
