= Alfred Potier =

French polymath (1840–1905)

Alfred Potier (11 May 1840 - 8 May 1905) was a French polymath who contributed to many theoretical and practical fields of science when this was rapidly expanding. His interests covered mainly mathematical physics, the nature of light and the ether, geology, electricity and magnetism and their practical applications in industry. His name appears in a little explored footnote inserted by Albert A. Michelson and Edward W. Morley in their famous publication.

== Biography ==
Born in 1840, Potier entered the École Polytechnique at age 17, where in 1867 he became a physics teacher, and then in 1881 full Professor of Physics, succeeding Jamin and preceding Nobel Laureate Henri Becquerel. At the same time, he was member of the State Mining Engineers Corps, occupying the chair of Physics in the École des Mines where he taught Henri Poincaré. Geological works included revisions of the geological map of France and submarine topographies in Pas-de-Calais in order to examine the feasibility of a tunnel to England. These, and his valor during the German siege of Paris in 1870, earned him the Légion d'honneur. His other publications concerned Fresnel’s theories of light and the ether, diffraction of polarized light, elliptical reflection, magnetic rotational forces, or interference fringes. He contributed extensive notes to JC Maxwell’s treatise on electromagnetism, facilitating its reading in France.

Potier was a member of many committees at the famous 1881 Universal Exposition in Paris, including the one that set the standards for units in electricity. The French Physics Society appointed Potier as president in 1884; the International Electricians Society did the same in 1895. In 1891 he was accepted into the French Academy of Science.

== Speed of light ==
Following Thomas Young’s ideas, light was regarded in the 19th century to move as vibrations (undulations) in a substance called the Luminiferous aether, contrary to Newton’s ideas that light itself was made of substantive corpuscles. Exploring the nature of this aether, Albert Michelson published in 1881 his laboratory experiments where he had light travel in the direction of the earth’s motion and perpendicular to it. Thus measured on the moving earth, he found no difference in the speed of light traveling with the earth or perpendicular to it. It would have fully conformed to rules prevailing in a Galilean invariance system of coordinates, also called Newtonian inertial system, which apply to moving material particles.

In the 1887 paper, written with Edward Morley, Michelson amended the route of the perpendicular light from ab1 to ab: “It may be mentioned here that the error was pointed out to the author of the former paper by M.A. Potier, of Paris, in the winter of 1881.” When the instrument on the moving earth is observed from a stationary point outside earth, the mirror at b1 already moved to b while light was traveling there from a. “This meant that Michelson had overestimated by a factor of two the fringe shifts originally expected.” The mirror at c also moved forward at the same time, but this was not taken into account. It thus seemed that light traveled different distances at the same time, which led George FitzGerald and Hendrik Lorentz (Lorentz ether theory) to postulate that distances shortened and time dilated in direction of motion (FitzGerald-Lorentz contraction).
