= De Sitter double star experiment =

The de Sitter effect was described by Willem de Sitter in 1913 (as well as by Daniel Frost Comstock in 1910) and used to support the special theory of relativity against a competing 1908 emission theory by Walther Ritz that postulated a variable speed of light dependent on the velocity of the emitting object. De Sitter showed that Ritz's theory would have predicted that the orbits of binary stars would appear more eccentric than consistent with experiment and with the laws of mechanics, and would have been inconsistent with astronomical observations. This was confirmed by Kenneth Brecher in 1977 by observing x-ray spectra. For other experiments related to special relativity, see tests of special relativity.

== The effect ==
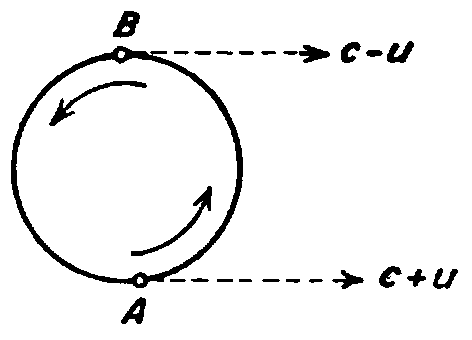
Willem de Sitter's argument against emission theory. According to simple emission theory, light moves at a speed of c with respect to the emitting object. If this were true, light emitted from a star in a double-star system from different parts of the orbital path would travel towards us at different speeds. For certain combinations of orbital speed, distance, and inclination, the "fast" light given off during approach would overtake "slow" light emitted during a recessional part of the star's orbit. Thus Kepler's laws of motion would apparently be violated for a distant observer. Many bizarre effects would be seen, including (a) as illustrated, unusually shaped variable star light curves such as have never been seen, (b) extreme Doppler red- and blue-shifts in phase with the light curves, implying highly non-Keplerian orbits, (c) splitting of the spectral lines (note simultaneous arrival of blue- and red-shifted light at the target), and (d) if the binary star system is resolvable in a telescope, the periodic breaking up of the stellar images into multiple images.

According to simple emission theory, light thrown off by an object should move at a speed of $c$ with respect to the emitting object. If there are no complicating dragging effects, the light would then be expected to move at this same speed until it eventually reached an observer. For an object moving directly towards (or away from) the observer at $v$, this light would then be expected to still be travelling at $(c+v)$ ( or $(c-v)$ ) at the time it reached us.

In 1913, Willem de Sitter argued that if this was true, a star orbiting in a double-star system would usually, with regard to us, alternate between moving towards us and away from us. Light emitted from different parts of the orbital path would travel towards us at different speeds. For a nearby star with a small orbital velocity (or whose orbital plane was almost perpendicular to our line of view) this might merely make the star's orbit seem erratic, but for a sufficient combination of orbital speed and distance (and inclination), the "fast" light given off during approach would be able to catch up with and even overtake "slow" light emitted earlier during a recessional part of the star's orbit, and the star would present an image that was scrambled and out of sequence. That is, Kepler's laws of motion would apparently be violated for a distant observer.

De Sitter made a study of double stars and found no cases where the stars' computed orbits appeared non-Keplerian. Since the total flight-time difference between "fast" and "slow" light signals would be expected to scale linearly with distance in simple emission theory, and the study would (statistically) have included stars with a reasonable spread of distances and orbital speeds and orientations, de Sitter concluded that the effect should have been seen if the model was correct, and its absence meant that the emission theory was almost certainly wrong.

== Notes ==
- Modern experiments of the de Sitter type refute the idea that light might travel at a speed that was partially dependent on the velocity of the emitter (c'=c + kv), where the emitter's velocity v can be positive or negative, and k is a factor between 0 and 1, denoting the extent to which the speed of light depends on the source velocity. De Sitter established an upper limit of k < 0.002, but extinction effects make that result suspect.
- De Sitter's experiment was criticized because of extinction effects by J. G. Fox. That is, during their flight to Earth, the light rays would have been absorbed and re-emitted by interstellar matter nearly at rest relative to Earth, so that the speed of light should become constant with respect to Earth, regardless of the motion of the original source(s).
- In 1977, Kenneth Brecher published the results of a similar double-survey, and reached a similar conclusion - that any apparent irregularities in double-star orbits were too small to support the emission theory. Contrary to the data cited by de Sitter, Brecher observed the x-ray spectrum, thereby eliminating possible influences of the extinction effect. He established an upper limit of $k < 2\times10^{-9}$.
- There are also terrestrial experiments that speak against such theories, see experiments testing emission theories.
