= J. G. Fox =

American nuclear physicist

John G. Fox
- Jack Fox
- Born: March 5, 1916; Biggar, Saskatchewan
- Died: July 24, 1980 (aged 64); Pittsburgh, Pennsylvania
- Education: Princeton University
- Scientific career
- Fields: Nuclear physics
- Workplaces: Carnegie Mellon University

John Gaston Fox (March 5, 1916 – July 24, 1980) was an American nuclear physicist. He earned his PhD from Princeton in 1941 and was soon recruited to work on the Manhattan Project. He later moved to Pittsburgh where he spent the rest of his career as a professor of physics at Carnegie Mellon University. He is best known for his work in the 1960s, applying the results of the extinction theorem to the then-current body of experimental evidence relating to both special relativity and emission theory.

== Brief biography ==
Jack Fox, as he was always known, was born in Biggar, Saskatchewan. He moved with his mother to Victoria at age 13, and left high school two years early to attend Victoria College. He went on to the University of Saskatchewan for his MS and Princeton for his PhD, both in physics. He worked briefly in industry before going to the Manhattan Project at Los Alamos for the duration of World War II. In 1947, he married Constance Sullivan of Victoria; they moved to Pittsburgh, Pennsylvania where he had joined the Carnegie Institute of Technology (later Carnegie Mellon). They both became U.S. citizens in 1955, and raised three children in the suburb of Oakmont, Pennsylvania. Fox died in Pittsburgh in 1980.

== Special relativity and the extinction theorem ==
The second postulate of Einstein's theory of special relativity states that the speed of light is invariant, regardless of the velocity of the source from which the light emanates. The extinction theorem (essentially) states that light passing through a transparent medium is simultaneously extinguished and re-emitted by the medium itself. This implies that information about the velocity of light from a moving source might be lost if the light passes through enough intervening transparent material before being measured. All measurements previous to the 1960s intending to verify the constancy of the speed of light from moving sources (primarily using moving mirrors, or extraterrestrial sources) were made only after the light had passed through such stationary material — that material being that of a glass lens, the terrestrial atmosphere, or even the incomplete vacuum of deep space. In 1961, Fox decided that there might not yet be any conclusive evidence for the second postulate: "This is a surprising situation in which to find ourselves half a century after the inception of special relativity." Regardless, he remained fully confident in special relativity, noting that this created only a "small gap" in the experimental record.

Fox suggested that better experiments were possible, in order to close that "small gap". Since photons with higher energies will, on average, travel much farther in any material before being extinguished and re-emitted, experiments using gamma rays instead of lower-energy visible light or x-rays would be dramatically less sensitive to the extinction problem. In 1963, along with T. A. Filippas (also of Carnegie Tech), Fox examined 68 MeV gamma rays emitted in the forward and backward directions by neutral pions moving at 0.2c, i.e., two-tenths the speed of light. The classical velocities of those photons should have been 1.2c and 0.8c, respectively, but this was not the case. The experiment, perhaps the earliest to be considered free of extinction effects, was successful: "We conclude that our results provide strong evidence that the velocity of radiation from a moving source is not the classical vector sum of c and the velocity of the source. Within our accuracy, the resultant sum is c as required by special relativity."

== Reexamination of Ritz's emission theory ==
The emission theory of Walter Ritz was considered early on to be an alternative to Einstein's special relativity. A key difference between the two is that under emission theory, the speed of light is expected to vary along with the speed of its source. Emission theory had long been disfavored by the 1960s, but Fox realized that the effects of extinction on the measurement of the speed of light nullified much of the accepted evidence against it. So in 1964, while still a firm believer in special relativity, Fox decided it was necessary to critically reexamine all of the evidence against Ritz's theory. In doing so, he showed that most of the previous rejections of Ritz's ideas based on theoretical arguments were invalid, including all of those enumerated by Wolfgang Pauli in his 1921 monograph on relativity. In addition, most previous experimental results disfavoring emission theory could be discarded as well, once extinction effects were considered, since the light (or other radiation) whose speed was measured was all actually re-emitted somewhere other than the original moving source. But Fox determined that his own work with Filippas, as well as very current work done at the CERN laboratory using 6 GeV gamma rays from neutral pions moving at very close to c, did, conclusively, support special relativity. His summary: "Our general conclusion is that there is still a good case against emission theories but that the evidence is different from and less than it has been thought to be."

== Other professional activities ==
In the late 1940s and 1950s, Fox was part of the Carnegie Tech team that created the then state-of-the-art 450 MeV synchrocyclotron at the Nuclear Research Center in nearby Saxonburg. (The experiment with Filippas, noted earlier, was performed at this facility.) He served as head of Carnegie Tech's department of physics from 1955 to 1961. In 1962/63, Fox spent a sabbatical year in France at the Laboratoire Joliot-Curie de Physique Nucléaire d'Orsay, in part because of the new synchrocyclotron installed there. In 1967/68 and 1971/72, Fox spent a total of three years living and working in India at the newly formed Indian Institute of Technology, in Kanpur, first as a visiting faculty member, and then as administrative head of the Kanpur Indo-American Program. Fox was also a consultant to the Nuclear Medicine Department of St. Francis General Hospital, in Pittsburgh.
