= Ewald–Oseen extinction theorem =

Theorem in optics that explains light propagation in a medium

In optics, the Ewald–Oseen extinction theorem, sometimes referred to as just the extinction theorem, is a theorem that underlies the common understanding of scattering (as well as refraction, reflection, and diffraction). It is named after Paul Peter Ewald and Carl Wilhelm Oseen, who proved the theorem in crystalline and isotropic media, respectively, in 1916 and 1915. Originally, the theorem applied to scattering by isotropic dielectric objects in free space. The scope of the theorem was greatly extended to encompass a wide variety of bianisotropic media.

== Overview ==
An important part of optical physics theory is starting with microscopic physics—the behavior of atoms and electrons—and using it to derive the familiar, macroscopic, laws of optics. In particular, there is a derivation of how the refractive index works and where it comes from, starting from microscopic physics. The Ewald–Oseen extinction theorem is one part of that derivation (as is the Lorentz–Lorenz equation etc.).

When light traveling in vacuum enters a transparent medium like glass, the light slows down, as described by the index of refraction. Although this fact is famous and familiar, it is actually quite strange and surprising when you think about it microscopically. After all, according to the superposition principle, the light in the glass is a superposition of:

- The original light wave, and
- The light waves emitted by oscillating electrons in the glass.

(Light is an oscillating electromagnetic field that pushes electrons back and forth, emitting dipole radiation.)

Individually, each of these waves travels at the speed of light in vacuum, not at the (slower) speed of light in glass. Yet when the waves are added up, they surprisingly create only a wave that travels at the slower speed.

The Ewald–Oseen extinction theorem says that the light emitted by the atoms has a component traveling at the speed of light in vacuum, which exactly cancels out ("extinguishes") the original light wave. Additionally, the light emitted by the atoms has a component which looks like a wave traveling at the slower speed of light in glass. Altogether, the only wave in the glass is the slow wave, consistent with what we expect from basic optics.

A more complete description can be found in Classical Optics and its Applications, by Masud Mansuripur. A proof of the classical theorem can be found in Principles of Optics, by Born and Wolf, and that of its extension has been presented by Akhlesh Lakhtakia.

== Derivation from Maxwell's equations ==
=== Introduction ===
When an electromagnetic wave enters a dielectric medium, it excites (resonates) the material's electrons whether they are free or bound, setting them into a vibratory state with the same frequency as the wave. These electrons will in turn radiate their own electromagnetic fields as a result of their oscillation (EM fields of oscillating charges). Due to the linearity of Maxwell equations, one expects the total field at any point in space to be the sum of the original field and the field produced by oscillating electrons. This result is, however, counterintuitive to the practical wave one observes in the dielectric moving at a speed of c/n, where n is the medium index of refraction. The Ewald–Oseen extinction theorem seek to address the disconnect by demonstrating how the superposition of these two waves reproduces the familiar result of a wave that moves at a speed of c/n.

=== Derivation ===
The following is a derivation based on a work by Ballenegger and Weber. Let's consider a simplified situation in which a monochromatic electromagnetic wave is normally incident on a medium filling half the space in the region z>0 as shown in Figure 1.

Figure 1: The half-space z>0 is a dielectric material with susceptibility χ. The half-space z<0 is vacuum.

The electric field at a point in space is the sum of the electric fields due to all the various sources. In our case, we separate the fields in two categories based on their generating sources. We denote the incident field
$$\mathbf{E}_{\mathrm{vac}}$$
and the sum of the fields generated by the oscillating electrons in the medium
$$\mathbf{E}_{\mathrm{rad}}(z, t).$$

The total field at any point z in space is then given by the superposition of the two contributions,
$$\mathbf{E}(z, t)= \mathbf{E}_{\mathrm{vac}}(z, t) + \mathbf{E}_{\mathrm{rad}}(z, t).$$

To match what we already observe, $\mathbf{E}_{\mathrm{vac}}$ has this form. However, we already know that inside the medium, z>0, we will only observe what we call the transmitted E-field $\mathbf{E}_{\mathrm{T}}$ which travels through the material at speed c/n.

Therefore, in this formalism,
$$\mathbf{E}_{\mathrm{rad}}(z, t) = -\mathbf{E}_{\mathrm{vac}}(z, t) + \mathbf{E}_{T}(z, t)$$

This to say that the radiated field cancels out the incident field and creates a transmitted field traveling within the medium at speed c/n. Using the same logic, outside the medium the radiated field produces the effect of a reflected field $\mathbf{E}_{R}$ traveling at speed c in the opposite direction to the incident field.
$$\mathbf{E}_{\mathrm{rad}}(z, t) = -\mathbf{E}_{\mathrm{vac}}(z, t) -\mathbf{E}_{R}(z, t)$$
assume that the wavelength is much larger than the average separation of atoms so that the medium can be considered continuous. We use the usual macroscopic E and B fields and take the medium to be nonmagnetic and neutral so that Maxwell's equations read
$$\begin{align}
\nabla \cdot \mathbf{E}&=0 \\
\nabla \cdot \mathbf{B}&=0 \\
\nabla \times \mathbf{E}&=-\frac {\partial \mathbf{B}} {\partial t} \\
\nabla \times \mathbf{B}&=\boldsymbol{\mu}_{0} \mathbf{J}+\epsilon_{0} \boldsymbol{\mu}_{0} \frac{\partial \mathbf{E}}{\partial t}
\end{align}$$
both the total electric and magnetic fields
$$\mathbf{E}=\mathbf{E}_{\mathrm{vac}}+\mathbf{E}_{\mathrm{rad}}, \quad \mathbf{B}=\mathbf{B}_{\mathrm{vac}}+\mathbf{B}_{\mathrm{rad}}$$
the set of Maxwell equations inside the dielectric
$$\begin{array}{l}
{\nabla \cdot \mathbf{E}_{\mathrm{rad}}=0} \\
{\nabla \cdot \mathbf{B}_{\mathrm{rad}}=0} \\ {\nabla \times \mathbf{E}_{\mathrm{rad}}=-\partial \mathbf{B}_{\mathrm{rad}} / \partial t} \\ {\nabla \times \mathbf{B}_{\mathrm{rad}}=\mu_{0} \mathbf{J}+\epsilon_{0} \mu_{0} \partial \mathbf{E}_{\mathrm{rad}} / \partial t}
\end{array}$$
where $\mathbf{J}$ includes the true and polarization current induced in the material by the outside electric field. We assume a linear relationship between the current and the electric field, hence
$$\mathbf{J}={\sigma} \left(\mathbf{E}_{\mathrm{vac}} + \mathbf{E}_{\mathrm{rad}}\right)$$

The set of Maxwell equations outside the dielectric has no current density term
$$\begin{array}{l}
{\nabla \cdot \mathbf{E}_{\mathrm{vac}}=0} \\
{\nabla \cdot \mathbf{B}_{\mathrm{vac}}=0} \\
{\nabla \times \mathbf{E}_{\mathrm{vac}}=-\partial \mathbf{B}_{\mathrm{vac}} / \partial t} \\
{\nabla \times \mathbf{B}_{\mathrm{vac}}=\epsilon_{0} \mu_{0} \partial \mathbf{E}_{\mathrm{vac}} / \partial t}
\end{array}$$

The two sets of Maxwell equations are coupled since the vacuum electric field appears in the current density term.

For a monochromatic wave at normal incidence, the vacuum electric field has the form
$$\mathbf{E}_{\mathrm{vac}}(z, t)=\mathbf{E}_{\mathrm{vac}} \exp [i(k z- \omega t)],$$
with $k=\omega /{c}$.

Now to solve for $\mathbf{E}_{\mathrm{rad}}$, we take the curl of the third equation in the first set of Maxwell equation and combine it with the fourth.
$$\begin{align}
\nabla\times(\nabla\times \mathbf{E}_{\mathrm{rad}}) &= -\frac \partial {\partial t} (\nabla\times\mathbf{B}_{\mathrm{rad}}) \\[1ex]
\nabla\times(\nabla \times \mathbf{E}_{\mathrm{rad}}) &= - \frac \partial {\partial t} \left(\mu_{0} \mathbf{J}+\epsilon_{0} \mu_{0} \frac{\partial \mathbf{E}_{\mathrm{rad}}} {\partial t}\right)
\end{align}$$

We simplify the double curl in a couple of steps using Einstein summation.
$$\begin{align}
\nabla\times(\nabla \times \mathbf{E})_{i}
&=
\epsilon_{i j k}\epsilon_{k l m} \partial_{j} \partial_{l} E_{m}
\\&=(\delta_{i l} \delta_{j \mathrm{m}}-\delta_{i \mathrm{m}} \delta_{j l})\partial_{j} \partial_{l} E_{m}
\\&=\partial_{i}(\partial_{j}E_{j})-\partial_{j}\partial_{j} E_{i}
\end{align}$$

Hence we obtain,
$$\nabla\times(\nabla \times \mathbf{E}_{rad})=\nabla(\nabla\cdot\mathbf{E}_{rad})-\nabla^2\mathbf{E}_{rad}$$

Then substituting $\mathbf{J}$ by ${\sigma} \left(\mathbf{E}_{\mathrm{vac}} + \mathbf{E}_{\mathrm{rad}}\right)$, using the fact that $\nabla\cdot\mathbf{E}_{\mathrm{rad}} = 0$ we obtain,
$$\nabla^2\mathbf{E}_\mathrm{rad} = \frac \partial {\partial t}(\mu_{0}{\sigma}\mathbf{E}_{\mathrm{vac}} + \mu_0 {\sigma} \mathbf{E}_{\mathrm{rad}} + \epsilon_{0} \mu_{0} \partial \mathbf{E}_{\mathrm{rad}} / \partial t)$$

Realizing that all the fields have the same time dependence $\exp (-i \omega t)$, the time derivatives are straightforward and we obtain the following inhomogeneous wave equation
$$\nabla^{2} \mathbf{E}_{\mathrm{rad}}+\mu_{0} \omega^{2}\left(\epsilon_{0}+i \sigma / \omega\right) \mathbf{E}_{\mathrm{rad}}= -i \mu_{0} \omega \sigma \mathbf{E}_{\mathrm{vac}}(z)$$
with particular solution
$$\mathbf{E}_{\mathrm{rad}}^{P} = -\mathbf{E}_{\mathrm{vac}}(z)$$

For the complete solution, we add to the particular solution the general solution of the homogeneous equation which is a superposition of plane waves traveling in arbitrary directions
$$\left(\mathbf{E}_{\mathrm{rad}}^{c}\right)_{i} = \int g_{i}(\boldsymbol{\theta}, \boldsymbol{\phi}) \exp \left(i \mathbf{k}' \cdot \mathbf{r}\right) d \Omega$$
where $k'$ is found from the homogeneous equation to be
$$k^{\prime 2}=\mu_{0} \epsilon_{0} \omega^2 \left(1+i \frac{\sigma}{\epsilon_{0} \omega}\right)$$

Note that we have taken the solution as a coherent superposition of plane waves. Because of symmetry, we expect the fields to be the same in a plane perpendicular to the $z$ axis. Hence $\mathbf{k}' \cdot \mathbf{a} = 0,$ where $\mathbf a$ is a displacement perpendicular to $z$.

Since there are no boundaries in the region $z>0$, we expect a wave traveling to the right. The solution to the homogeneous equation becomes,
$$\mathbf{E}_{\mathrm{rad}}^{c} = \mathbf{E}_{T} \exp \left(i k' z\right)$$

Adding this to the particular solution, we get the radiated wave inside the medium ($z > 0$)
$$\mathbf{E}_{\mathrm{rad}} = -\mathbf{E}_{\mathrm{vac}}(z) + \mathbf{E}_{T} \exp \left(i k' z\right)$$

The total field at any position $z$ is the sum of the incident and radiated fields at that position. Adding the two components inside the medium, we get the total field
$$\mathrm{E}(z) = \mathrm{E}_{T} \exp \left(i k' z\right), \qquad z>0$$

This wave travels inside the dielectric at speed $c/n,$
$$n = c k' / \omega = \sqrt{1+i \frac{\sigma}{\epsilon_{0} \omega}}$$

We can simplify the above $n$ to a familiar form of the index of refraction of a linear isotropic dielectric. To do so, we remember that in a linear dielectric an applied electric field $\mathbf E$ induces a polarization $\mathbf P$ proportional to the electric field $\mathbf P = \epsilon_{0} \chi_{e} \mathbf{E}$. When the electric field changes, the induced charges move and produces a current density given by $\partial \mathbf{P} / \partial t$. Since the time dependence of the electric field is $\exp(-i\omega t)$, we get
$$\mathbf{J}=-i \epsilon_{0} \omega \chi_{e} \mathbf{E},$$
which implies that the conductivity
$$\sigma=-i \epsilon_{0} \omega \chi_{e}.$$

Then substituting the conductivity in the equation of $n$, gives
$$n=\sqrt{1+\chi_{e}}$$
which is a more familiar form. For the region $z<0$, one imposes the condition of a wave traveling to the left. By setting the conductivity in this region $\sigma=0$, we obtain the reflected wave
$$\mathrm{E}(z) = \mathrm{E}_{R} \exp \left(-i k z\right),$$
traveling at the speed of light.

Note that the coefficients nomenclature, $\mathbf E_{T}$ and $\mathbf E_{R}$, are only adopted to match what we already expect.

== Hertz vector approach ==
The following is a derivation based on a work by Wangsness and a similar derivation found in chapter 20 of Zangwill's text, Modern Electrodynamics. The setup is as follows, let the infinite half-space $z<0$ be vacuum and the infinite half-space $z>0$ be a uniform, isotropic, dielectric material with electric susceptibility, $\chi.$

The inhomogeneous electromagnetic wave equation for the electric field can be written in terms of the electric Hertz Potential, $\boldsymbol{\pi}_{\mathrm{e}}$, in the Lorenz gauge as
$$\nabla^{2} \boldsymbol{\pi}_{\mathrm{e}}-\frac{1}{c^2} \frac{\partial^{2} \boldsymbol{\pi}_{\mathrm{e}}}{\partial t^{2}}=-\frac{\mathbf{P} }{\epsilon_{0}}.$$

The electric field in terms of the Hertz vectors is given as
$$\mathbf{E}=\nabla \times \nabla \times \boldsymbol\pi_{\mathrm{e}}-\frac{\mathbf{P}}{\epsilon_{0}}-
\frac{\partial}{\partial t}
\left(\nabla \times \boldsymbol{\pi}_{\mathrm{m}}
\right),$$
but the magnetic Hertz vector $\boldsymbol{\pi}_{\mathrm{m}}$ is 0 since the material is assumed to be non-magnetizable and there is no external magnetic field. Therefore, the electric field simplifies to
$$\mathbf{E} = \nabla \times \nabla \times \boldsymbol\pi_{\mathrm{e}} - \frac{\mathbf{P}}{\epsilon_{0}}.$$

In order to calculate the electric field we must first solve the inhomogeneous wave equation for $\boldsymbol{\pi}_{\mathrm{e}}$. To do this, split $\boldsymbol{\pi}_{\mathrm{e}}$ in the homogeneous and particular solutions
$$\boldsymbol{\pi}_{\mathrm{e}}(\mathbf{r}, t) = \boldsymbol{\pi}_{e,h}(\mathbf{r}, t) + \boldsymbol{\pi}_{\mathrm{e,p}}(\mathbf{r}, t).$$

Linearity then allows us to write
$$\mathbf{E}(\mathbf{r}, t)=\mathbf{E}_{h}(\mathbf{r}, t)+\mathbf{E}_{\mathrm{p}}(\mathbf{r}, t).$$

The homogeneous solution, $\mathbf{E}_{h}(\mathbf{r}, t)$, is the initial plane wave traveling with wave vector $k_0 = \omega/c$ in the positive $z$ direction
$$\mathbf{E}_{h}(\mathbf{r}, t) = \mathbf{E}_{0} e^{i\left(k_{0} z - \omega t\right)} .$$

We do not need to explicitly find $\boldsymbol{\pi}_{e,h}(\mathbf{r}, t)$ since we are only interested in finding the field.

The particular solution, $\boldsymbol{\pi}_{\mathrm{e,p}}(\mathbf{r}, t)$ and therefore, $\mathbf{E}_{\mathrm{p}}(\mathbf{r}, t)$, is found using a time dependent Green's function method on the inhomogeneous wave equation for $\boldsymbol{\pi}_{\mathrm{e,p}}$ which produces the retarded integral
$$\boldsymbol{\pi}_{\mathrm{e,p}}(\mathbf{r}, t) = \frac{1}{4 \pi \epsilon_{0}} \int d^3 r' \frac{\mathbf{P}\left(\mathbf{r}', t - \left|\mathbf{r}-\mathbf{r}'\right| / c\right)}{\left|\mathbf{r}-\mathbf{r}'\right|}.$$

Since the initial electric field is polarizing the material, the polarization vector must have the same space and time dependence $\mathbf{P}(\mathbf{r}, t) = \mathbf{P}_{0} e^{i(k z-\omega t)}.$ More detail about this assumption is discussed by Wangsness. Plugging this into the integral and expressing in terms of Cartesian coordinates produces
$$\boldsymbol{\pi}_{\mathrm{e,p}}(\mathbf{r}, t)= \frac{\mathbf{P}_{0} e^{ i(k z-\omega t)}} {4 \pi \epsilon_{0}} \int_{0}^{\infty} dz' e^{ i k\left(z'-z\right)} \int_{-\infty}^{\infty} dx' \int_{-\infty}^{\infty} dy' \frac{e^{ i k_0 \left|\mathbf{r}-\mathbf{r}'\right|}}{\left|\mathbf{r}-\mathbf{r}'\right|}.$$

First, consider only the integration over $x'$ and $y'$ and convert this to cylindrical coordinates $(x,y,z)\rightarrow(\rho,\varphi,z)$ and call $\left|\mathbf{r}-\mathbf{r}'\right| = R$
$$I:=\int_{-\infty}^{\infty} d x^{\prime} \int_{-\infty}^{\infty} d y^{\prime} \frac{e^{ i k_{0}\left|\mathbf{r}-\mathbf{r}^{\prime}\right|}}{\left|\mathbf{r}-\mathbf{r}^{\prime}\right|}
=
\int_{0}^{2\pi} d \varphi' \int_{0}^{\infty} d \rho' \frac{e^{ i k_0 R}}{R}
=
2\pi \int_{0}^{\infty} d \rho' \frac{e^{ i k_{0}R}}{R}.$$

Then using the substitution
$$R^{2}=\rho^{2}+\left|z'-z\right|^{2}
\Rightarrow
\rho^{2} = R^{2}-\left|z'-z\right|^{2}
\Rightarrow
\rho \, d \rho = R \,  dR$$
and
$$\rho=\sqrt{R^2-\left|z'-z\right|^2}$$
so the limits become
$$\rho=0=\sqrt{R^{2}-\left|z'-z\right|^{2}} \Rightarrow R=\left|z'-z\right|$$
and
$$\rho = \infty=\sqrt{R^2-\left|z'-z\right|^2} \Rightarrow R=\infty.$$

Then introduce a convergence factor $e^{-\epsilon R}$ with $\epsilon \in \R$ into the integrand since it does not change the value of the integral,

$$\begin{align}
I &=
2\pi \int_{\left|z'-z\right|}^{\infty} d R e^{ i k_{0}R}
\\&=
2\pi \lim_{\epsilon \to 0}\int_{\left|z'-z\right|}^{\infty} d R e^{(i k_{0}-\epsilon)R}
\\&=
\left. 2\pi \lim_{\epsilon \to 0} \left[\frac{e^{(i k_{0}-\epsilon)R}}{i k_{0}-\epsilon}\right]
\right|_{\left|z'-z\right|}^\infty
\\&=
2\pi \lim_{\epsilon \to 0} \left[\frac{e^{(i k_{0}-\epsilon)\infty}}{i k_{0}-\epsilon}-\frac{e^{(i k_{0}-\epsilon){\left|z'-z\right|}}}{i k_{0}-\epsilon}\right].
\end{align}$$

Then $\epsilon \in \R$ implies $\lim_{\epsilon \to 0} e^{-\epsilon\infty}=0$, hence $\lim_{\epsilon \to 0} e^{(i k_{0}-\epsilon)\infty} = \lim_{\epsilon \to 0}e^{i k_{0}\infty} e^{-\epsilon\infty}=0$. Therefore,
$$\begin{align}
I &=
2\pi \lim_{\epsilon \to 0} \left[0-\frac{e^{(i k_{0}-\epsilon){\left|z^{\prime}-z\right|}}}{i k_{0}-\epsilon}\right]
\\&=
-2\pi \frac{e^{i k_{0}{\left|z'-z\right|}}}{i k_{0}}
\\&=
2\pi i \frac{e^{i k_{0}{\left|z'-z\right|}}}{k_{0}}.
\end{align}$$

Now, plugging this result back into the z-integral yields
$$\boldsymbol{\pi}_{\mathrm{e,p}}(z, t)= \frac{i\mathbf{P}_{0}
e^{ i(k z-\omega t)}
}{2 k_{0}\epsilon_{0}} \int_{0}^{\infty} d z'
e^{ i k\left(z'-z\right) }
e^{ i k_{0}\left|z-z'\right|}$$

Notice that $\boldsymbol{\pi}_{\mathrm{e,p}}$ is now only a function of $z$ and not $\mathbf{r}$, which was expected for the given symmetry.

This integration must be split into two due to the absolute value $\left|z-z' \right|$ inside the integrand. The regions are $z<0$ and $z>0$. Again, a convergence factor must be introduced to evaluate both integrals and the result is
$$\boldsymbol{\pi}_{\mathrm{e,p}}(z, t)=-\frac{\mathbf{P}e^{ -i \omega t}} {2 \epsilon_{0} k_{0}}
\begin{cases}
{{\frac{1}{k+k_{0}} e^{ -i k_{0} z}}} & {z<0}
\\ {\frac{2 k_{0}}{k_{0}^{2}-k^{2}} e^{ i k z}
+
\frac{1}{k-k_{0}} e^{ i k_{0} z}} & {z>0.}
\end{cases}$$

Instead of plugging $\boldsymbol{\pi}_{\mathrm{e,p}}$ directly into the expression for the electric field, several simplifications can be made. Begin with the curl of the curl vector identity,
$$\nabla \times(\nabla \times \mathbf{\boldsymbol{\pi}_{\mathrm{e,p}}})=\nabla(\nabla \cdot \mathbf{\boldsymbol{\pi}_{\mathrm{e,p}}})-\nabla^{2} \mathbf{\boldsymbol{\pi}_{\mathrm{e,p}}},$$
therefore,
$$\begin{align}
\mathbf{E}_{\mathrm{p}}
&=
\nabla \times \nabla \times \boldsymbol\pi_{\mathrm{e}}-\frac{\mathbf{P}}{\epsilon_{0}}
\\&=
\nabla(\nabla \cdot \boldsymbol{\pi}_{\mathrm{e,p}})-\nabla^{2} \boldsymbol{\pi}_{\mathrm{e,p}}-\frac{\mathbf{P}}{\epsilon_{0}}.
\end{align}$$

Notice that $\nabla \cdot \boldsymbol{\pi}_{\mathrm{e,p}} = 0$ because $\mathbf{P}$ has no ${\mathbf{z}}$ dependence and is always perpendicular to $\hat{\mathbf{z}}$. Also, notice that the second and third terms are equivalent to the inhomogeneous wave equation, therefore,
$$\begin{align}
\mathbf{E}_{\mathrm{p}}
&=
-\frac{1}{c^{2}} \frac{\partial^{2} \boldsymbol{\pi}_{\mathrm{e,p}}}{\partial t^{2}}
\\&=
-\frac{1}{c^{2}} (-i\omega)^2 \boldsymbol{\pi}_{\mathrm{e,p}}
\\&=
k_{0}^2 \boldsymbol{\pi}_{\mathrm{e,p}}
\end{align}$$

Therefore, the total field is
$$\mathbf{E}(z, t)=\mathbf{E}_{0}
e^{i\left(k_{0} z-\omega t\right)}
+k_{0}^{2} \boldsymbol\pi_{\mathrm{e,p}}(z, t)$$
which becomes,
$$\mathbf{E}(z, t)
=
\left\{\begin{array}{l}
{\mathbf{E}_{0} e^{i\left(k_{0} z-\omega t\right)}-\frac{\mathbf{P}}{2 \epsilon_{0}} \frac{k_{0}}{k+k_{0}} e^{-i\left(k_{0} z+\omega t\right)}} & {z<0} \\
{\mathbf{E}_{0} e^{i\left(k_{0} z-\omega t\right)}-\frac{\mathbf{P}}{2 \epsilon_{0}} \frac{k_{0}}{k-k_{0}} e^{i\left(k_{0} z-\omega t\right)}-\frac{\mathbf{P}}{\epsilon_{0}} \frac{k_{0}^{2}}{k_{0}^{2}-k^{2}} e^{i(k z-\omega t)}} & {z>0.}
\end{array}\right.$$

Now focus on the field inside the dielectric. Using the fact that $\mathbf{E}(z, t)$ is complex, we may immediately write
$$\mathbf{E}(z>0, t) = \mathbf{E}
e^{i\left(k_{0} z-\omega t\right)}$$
recall also that inside the dielectric we have $\mathbf{P} =\epsilon_{0} \chi \mathbf{E}$.

Then by coefficient matching we find,
$$e^{i\left(k z-\omega t\right)}
\Rightarrow
1=-\chi \frac{k_{0}^{2}}{k_{0}^{2}-k^{2}}$$
and
$$e^{i\left(k_{0} z-\omega t\right)}
\Rightarrow
0=\mathbf{E}_{0}-\frac{\chi}{2} \frac{k_{0}}{k-k_{0}} \mathbf{E}.$$

The first relation quickly yields the wave vector in the dielectric in terms of the incident wave as
$$\begin{align}
k
&=\sqrt{1+\chi} k_{0}
\\&=n k_{0}.
\end{align}$$

Using this result and the definition of $\mathbf{P}$ in the second expression yields the polarization vector in terms of the incident electric field as
$$\mathbf{P}
=
2 \epsilon_{0}(n-1) \mathbf{E}_{0}.$$

Both of these results can be substituted into the expression for the electric field to obtain the final expression
$$\mathbf{E}(z, t)
=
\left\{\begin{array}{l}
{\mathbf{E}_{0} e^{i\left(k_{0} z-\omega t\right)}
-\left(\frac{n-1}{n+1}\right) \mathbf{E}_{0} e^{-i\left(k_{0} z+\omega t\right)}} & {z<0} \\
{\left(\frac{2}{n+1}\right) \mathbf{E}_{0} e^{i\left(n k_{0} z-\omega t\right)}} & {z>0.}
\end{array}\right.$$

This is exactly the result as expected. There is only one wave inside the medium and it has wave speed reduced by n. The expected reflection and transmission coefficients are also recovered.

== Extinction lengths and tests of special relativity ==
The characteristic "extinction length" of a medium is the distance after which the original wave can be said to have been completely replaced. For visible light, traveling in air at sea level, this distance is approximately 1 mm. In interstellar space, the extinction length for light is 2 light years. At very high frequencies, the electrons in the medium can't "follow" the original wave into oscillation, which lets that wave travel much further: for 0.5 MeV gamma rays, the length is 19 cm of air and 0.3 mm of Lucite, and for 4.4 GeV, 1.7 m in air, and 1.4 mm in carbon.

Special relativity predicts that the speed of light in vacuum is independent of the velocity of the source emitting it. This widely believed prediction has been occasionally tested using astronomical observations. For example, in a binary star system, the two stars are moving in opposite directions, and one might test the prediction by analyzing their light. (See, for instance, the De Sitter double star experiment.) Unfortunately, the extinction length of light in space nullifies the results of any such experiments using visible light, especially when taking account of the thick cloud of stationary gas surrounding such stars. However, experiments using X-rays emitted by binary pulsars, with much longer extinction length, have been successful. Other controversial experiments have also been conducted at the Navy Electronics Laboratory to test the speed of light emitted from moving sources.
