= Solutions of the Einstein field equations =

Aspect of general relativity

Solutions of the Einstein field equations are metrics of spacetimes that result from solving the Einstein field equations (EFE) of general relativity. Solving the field equations gives a Lorentz manifold. Solutions are broadly classed as exact or non-exact.

The Einstein field equations are

$$G_{\mu\nu} + \Lambda g_{\mu\nu} \, = \kappa T_{\mu\nu} ,$$

where $G_{\mu\nu}$ is the Einstein tensor, $\Lambda$ is the cosmological constant (sometimes taken to be zero for simplicity), $g_{\mu\nu}$ is the metric tensor, $\kappa$ is a constant, and $T_{\mu\nu}$ is the stress–energy tensor.

The Einstein field equations relate the Einstein tensor to the stress–energy tensor, which represents the distribution of energy, momentum and stress in the spacetime manifold. The Einstein tensor is built up from the metric tensor and its partial derivatives; thus, given the stress–energy tensor, the Einstein field equations are a system of ten partial differential equations in which the metric tensor can be solved for.

== Solving the equations ==
It is important to realize that the Einstein field equations alone are not enough to determine the evolution of a gravitational system in many cases. They depend on the stress–energy tensor, which depends on the dynamics of matter and energy (such as trajectories of moving particles), which in turn depends on the gravitational field. If one is only interested in the weak field limit of the theory, the dynamics of matter can be computed using special relativity methods and/or Newtonian laws of gravity and the resulting stress–energy tensor can then be plugged into the Einstein field equations. But if one requires an exact solution or a solution describing strong fields, the evolution of both the metric and the stress–energy tensor must be solved for at once.

To obtain solutions, the relevant equations are the above quoted EFE (in either form) plus the continuity equation (to determine the evolution of the stress–energy tensor):

$$T^{ab}{}_{;b}  \, = 0 \,.$$

These amount to only 14 equations (10 from the field equations and 4 from the continuity equation) and are by themselves insufficient for determining the 20 unknowns (10 metric components and 10 stress–energy tensor components). The equations of state are missing. In the most general case, it's easy to see that at least 6 more equations are required, possibly more if there are internal degrees of freedom (such as temperature) which may vary throughout spacetime.

In practice, it is usually possible to simplify the problem by replacing the full set of equations of state with a simple approximation. Some common approximations are:

- Vacuum:

$$T_{ab} \, = 0$$

- Perfect fluid:

$T_{ab} \, = (\rho + p)u_a u_b + p g_{ab}$ where $u^au_a = -1$

Here $\rho$ is the mass–energy density measured in a momentary co-moving frame, $u_a$ is the fluid's 4-velocity vector field, and $p$ is the pressure.

- Non-interacting dust ( a special case of perfect fluid ):

$$T_{ab} \, = \rho u_a u_b$$

For a perfect fluid, another equation of state relating density $\rho$ and pressure $p$ must be added. This equation will often depend on temperature, so a heat transfer equation is required or the postulate that heat transfer can be neglected.

Next, notice that only 10 of the original 14 equations are independent, because the continuity equation $T^{ab}{}_{;b} = 0$ is a consequence of Einstein's equations. This reflects the fact that the system is gauge invariant (in general, absent some symmetry, any choice of a curvilinear coordinate net on the same system would correspond to a numerically different solution.) A "gauge fixing" is needed, i.e. we need to impose 4 (arbitrary) constraints on the coordinate system in order to obtain unequivocal results. These constraints are known as coordinate conditions.

A popular choice of gauge is the so-called "De Donder gauge", also known as the harmonic condition or harmonic gauge

$$g^{\mu\nu} \Gamma^{\sigma}{}_{\mu\nu} = 0 \,.$$

In numerical relativity, the preferred gauge is the so-called "3+1 decomposition", based on the ADM formalism. In this decomposition, metric is written in the form

$ds^2 \, = (-N + N^i N^j \gamma_{ij}) dt^2 + 2N^i \gamma_{ij} dt dx^j + \gamma_{ij} dx^i dx^j$, where $i,j = 1\dots 3 \,.$

$N$ and $N^i$ are functions of spacetime coordinates and can be chosen arbitrarily in each point. The remaining physical degrees of freedom are contained in $\gamma_{ij}$, which represents the Riemannian metric on 3-hypersurfaces with constant $t$. For example, a naive choice of $N=1$, $N_i=0$, would correspond to a so-called synchronous coordinate system: one where t-coordinate coincides with proper time for any comoving observer (particle that moves along a fixed $x^i$ trajectory.)

Once equations of state are chosen and the gauge is fixed, the complete set of equations can be solved. Unfortunately, even in the simplest case of gravitational field in the vacuum (vanishing stress–energy tensor), the problem is too complex to be exactly solvable. To get physical results, we can either turn to numerical methods, try to find exact solutions by imposing symmetries, or try middle-ground approaches such as perturbation methods or linear approximations of the Einstein tensor.

== Exact solutions ==
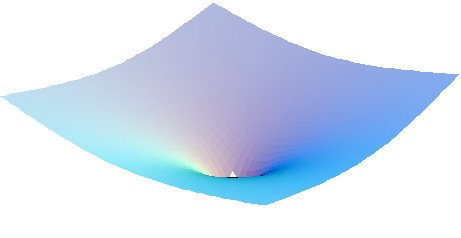
An illustration of the Schwarzschild metric, which describes spacetime around a spherical, uncharged, and nonrotating object with mass

A major area of research is the discovery of exact solutions to the Einstein field equations. Solving these equations amounts to calculating a precise value for the metric tensor (which defines the curvature and geometry of spacetime) under certain physical conditions. There is no formal definition for what constitutes such solutions, but most scientists agree that they should be expressable using elementary functions or linear differential equations. Some of the most notable solutions of the equations include:

- The Schwarzschild solution, which describes spacetime surrounding a spherically symmetric non-rotating uncharged massive object. For compact enough objects, this solution generated a black hole with a central singularity. At points far away from the central mass, the accelerations predicted by the Schwarzschild solution are nearly identical to those predicted by Newton's theory of gravity.
- The Reissner–Nordström solution, which analyzes a non-rotating spherically symmetric object with charge and was independently discovered by several different researchers between 1916 and 1921. In some cases, this solution can predict the existence of black holes with double event horizons.
- The Kerr solution, which generalizes the Schwarzchild solution to rotating massive objects. Because of the difficulty of factoring in the effects of rotation into the Einstein field equations, this solution was not discovered until 1963.
- The Kerr–Newman solution for charged, rotating massive objects. This solution was derived in 1964, using the same technique of complex coordinate transformation that was used for the Kerr solution.
- The cosmological Friedmann–Lemaître–Robertson–Walker solution, discovered in 1922 by Alexander Friedmann and then confirmed in 1927 by Georges Lemaître. This solution was revolutionary for predicting the expansion of the Universe, which was confirmed seven years later after a series of measurements by Edwin Hubble. It even showed that general relativity was incompatible with a static universe, and Einstein later conceded that he had been wrong to design his field equations to account for a Universe that was not expanding.

Today, there remain many important situations in which the Einstein field equations have not been solved. Chief among these is the two-body problem, which concerns the geometry of spacetime around two mutually interacting massive objects, such as the Sun and the Earth, or the two stars in a binary star system. The situation gets even more complicated when considering the interactions of three or more massive bodies (the "n-body problem"). However, it is still possible to construct an approximate solution to the field equations in the n-body problem by using the technique of post-Newtonian expansion. In general, the extreme nonlinearity of the Einstein field equations makes it difficult to solve them in all but the most specific cases.

== Non-exact solutions ==
The solutions that are not exact are called non-exact solutions. Such solutions mainly arise due to the difficulty of solving the EFE in closed form and often take the form of approximations to ideal system. For most physical scenarios, it is impossible to find an exact solution, so approximations are made. In such cases, non-exact solutions can still be used for modeling realistic cosmological systems. Additionally, many non-exact solutions may be devoid of physical content, but serve as useful counterexamples to theoretical conjectures.

Non-exact solutions are often found using numerical methods or perturbation theory. Common perturbative approaches include taking a Post-Newtonian expansion, which begins with a Newtonian baseline and add corrections to account for relativistic effects. Numerical methods for solving the coupled differential equations include spectral methods in which the functions are expanded in sets of orthogonal polynomials or functions, finite-difference methods, and finite element methods. Computer simulations are also often used to find non-exact solutions, especially in strong field scenarios such as massive stars or black holes, and can help detect critical behaviors and unexpected phenomena. Using computer simulations to find these solutions is a technique called numerical relativity.

== Applications ==
There are practical as well as theoretical reasons for studying solutions of the Einstein field equations.

From a purely mathematical viewpoint, it is interesting to know the set of solutions of the Einstein field equations. Some of these solutions are parametrised by one or more parameters. From a physical standpoint, knowing the solutions of the Einstein Field Equations allows highly-precise modelling of astrophysical phenomena, including black holes, neutron stars, and stellar systems. Predictions can be made analytically about the system analyzed; such predictions include the perihelion precession of Mercury, the existence of a co-rotating region inside spinning black holes, and the orbits of objects around massive bodies.

== See also ==
- Ricci calculus
- Albert Einstein
