= Covariance group =

In physics, a covariance group is a group of coordinate transformations between frames of reference. A frame of reference provides a set of coordinates for an observer moving with that frame to make measurements and define physical quantities. The covariance principle states that the laws of physics should transform from one frame to another covariantly, that is, according to a representation of the covariance group.

Special relativity considers observers in inertial frames, and the covariance group consists of rotations, velocity boosts, and the parity transformation. It is denoted as O(1, 3) and is often referred to as Lorentz group.

For example, the Maxwell equation with sources,
$$\partial_\mu F^{\mu\nu} = 4\pi j^\nu,$$
transforms as a four-vector, that is, under the (1/2, 1/2) representation of the O(1,3) group.

The Dirac equation,
$$(i\gamma^\mu \partial_\mu - m)\psi = 0,$$
transforms as a Dirac spinor, that is, under the (1/2, 0) ⊕ (0, 1/2) representation of the O(1, 3) group.

The covariance principle, unlike the relativity principle, does not imply that the equations are invariant under transformations from the covariance group. In practice the equations for electromagnetic and strong interactions are invariant, while the weak interaction is not invariant under the parity transformation. For example, the Maxwell equation is invariant, while the corresponding equation for the weak field explicitly contains left currents and thus is not invariant under the parity transformation.

In general relativity the covariance group consists of all arbitrary (invertible and differentiable) coordinate transformations.

== See also ==
- Manifestly covariant
- Relativistic wave equations
- Representation theory of the Lorentz group
