= Non-exact solutions in general relativity =

Solutions of the Einstein field equations which hold only approximately

Non-exact solutions in general relativity are solutions of Albert Einstein's field equations of general relativity which hold only approximately. These solutions are typically found by treating the gravitational field, $g$, as a background space-time, $\gamma$, (which is usually an exact solution) plus some small perturbation, $h$. Then one is able to solve the Einstein field equations as a series in $h$, dropping higher order terms for simplicity.

A common example of this method results in the linearised Einstein field equations. In this case we expand the full space-time metric about the flat Minkowski metric, $\eta_{\mu\nu}$:

$$g_{\mu\nu} = \eta_{\mu\nu} + h_{\mu\nu} +\mathcal{O}(h^2)$$,

and dropping all terms which are of second or higher order in $h$.

== See also ==
- Exact solutions in general relativity
- Linearized gravity
- Post-Newtonian expansion
- Parameterized post-Newtonian formalism
- Numerical relativity
