= High-energy string scattering amplitudes =

In string theory, high-energy scattering amplitudes describe the interactions of strings at extreme energy scales, such as the Planck scale. Unlike point-particle theories that exhibit power-law behavior, string amplitudes are characterized by a universal, soft exponential fall-off at high energies and fixed angles.

== Background ==
The Gross conjecture regarding high energy symmetry of string theory was based on the saddle-point calculation of hard string scattering amplitudes (SSA) of both the closed and open string theories. The conjecture claimed that there existed infinite linear relations among hard SSA of different string states. Moreover, these infinite linear relations were so powerful that they can be used to solve all the hard SSA and express them in terms of one amplitude. Some monographs had made speculations about this hidden stringy symmetry without getting any conclusive results. However, the saddle-point calculation of the hard SSA which was claimed to be valid for all string states and all string loop orders was pointed out to be inconsistent for the cases of the excited string states in a series of works done by the method of decoupling of zero-norm states (ZNS).

It was then further shown that even at closed string-tree level, there was no reliable saddle-point in the hard SSA calculation. Three evidences have been given to demonstrate the inconsistency of the saddle-point. So instead of using the saddle-point method, they used the KLT formula to obtain the correct hard closed SSA, which differs from result of Gross and Mende by an oscillation prefactor. This prefactor consistently implied the existence of infinitely many zeros and poles in the hard SSA.

Soon later a similar conclusion was made based on the group theoretical calculation of SSA. They found out that up to the string one-loop level the saddle-point calculation was valid only for the hard four tachyon SSA, but was incorrect for other hard SSA of excited string states. For this reason, the authors admitted that they can not consistently find out any linear relations as suggested in Gross conjecture.

== Calculations ==
For the case of open bosonic string at the mass level $M^{2}=4$, as an example, the hard open SSA of Gross and Manes were miscalculated to be

$$T_{TTT}\propto T_{[LT]}, T_{LLT}=T_{(LT)}=0,$$

which were inconsistent with the Ward identities or the decoupling of zero-norm states (ZNS) in the hard scattering limit to be discussed below.

The importance of two types of ZNS was stressed in the massive background field calculation of string symmetries. It was shown that in the weak field approximation (but valid for all energies) an inter-particle symmetry transformation

$$\delta C_{(\mu\nu\lambda)}=\frac{1}{2}\partial_{(\mu}\partial_{\nu} \theta_{\lambda)}^{2}-2\eta_{(\mu\nu}\theta_{\lambda)}^{2},\delta C_{[\mu\nu ]}=9\partial_{\lbrack\mu}\theta_{\nu]}^{2}$$

for two propagating states $C_{(\mu\nu\lambda)}$ and $C_{[\mu\nu]}$ at mass level $M^{2}=4$ of open bosonic string can be generated by the $D_{2}$ vector ZNS with polarization $\theta_{\mu}^{2}$

$$|D_{2}\rangle=[(\frac{1}{2}k_{\mu}k_{\nu}\theta_{\lambda}^{2}+2\eta_{\mu\nu }\theta_{\lambda}^{2})\alpha_{-1}^{\mu}\alpha_{-1}^{\nu}\alpha_{-1}^{\lambda }+9k_{\mu}\theta_{\nu}^{2}\alpha_{-2}^{[\mu}\alpha_{-1}^{\nu]}-6\theta_{\mu }^{2}\alpha_{-3}^{\mu}]\left\vert 0,k\right\rangle , k\cdot\theta ^{2}=0.$$

Incidentally, a set of discrete ZNS $G_{J,M}^{+}$ were shown to form the $w_{\infty}$ spacetime symmetry algebra of the toy $2D$ string theory.

The first set of linear relations among hard SSA was obtained for the mass level $M^{2}=4$ of the $26D$ open bosonic string theory by the method of decoupling of ZNS. (Note that the decoupling of ZNS was also used in the group theoretical calculation of SSA to fix the measure in the SSA calculation). By solving the following three linear relations or stringy Ward identities among the four leading order hard SSA

$$T_{LLT}^{5\rightarrow 3}+T_{(LT)}^{3} =0, 10T_{LLT}^{5\rightarrow 3}+T_{TTT}^{3}+18 T_{(LT)}^{3} =0, T_{LLT}^{5\rightarrow 3}+T_{TTT}^{3}+9 T_{[LT]}^{3}=0,$$

one obtains the ratios

$$T_{TTT}:T_{LLT}:T_{(LT)}:T_{[LT]}=8:1:-1:-1.$$

These ratios were justified by a set of sample calculation of hard SSA. Similar results were obtained for the mass level $M^{2}=6$. On the other hand, a remedy calculation was performed to recover the missing terms calculated by Gross and Manes in order to obtain the correct four ratios above.

The ratios calculated above for the mass level $M^{2}=4$ can be generalized to arbitrary mass levels $M^{2}=2(N-1)$

$$\frac{T^{(N,2m,q)}}{T^{(N,0,0)}}=\left(  -\frac{1}{M}\right)  ^{2m+q}\left( \frac{1}{2}\right)  ^{m+q}(2m-1)!!.$$

In addition to the method of decoupling of ZNS, a dual method called the Virasoro constraint method and a corrected saddle-point calculation (for string-tree amplitudes) also gave the same ratios above. The linear relations and ratios obtained by the decoupling of ZNS are valid for all string-loop orders since ZNS should be decoupled for all loop amplitudes due to unitarity of the theory. This important fact was not shared by the saddle-point calculation and neither of the group theoretical calculation of SSA. On the other hand, one believes that by keeping $M$ fixed as a finite constant one can obtain more information about the high energy behavior of string theory compared to the tensionless string ($\alpha^{\prime}\rightarrow\infty$) approach in which all string states are massless.

Since the linear relations obtained by the decoupling of ZNS are valid order by order and share the same forms for all orders in string perturbation theory, one expects that there exists stringy symmetry of the theory. Indeed, two such symmetry groups were suggested recently to be the $SL(5,\mathbb{C})$ group in the Regge scattering limit and the $SL(4,\mathbb{C})$ group in the non-relativistic scattering limit. Moreover, It was shown that the linear ratios for the mass level $M^2=2(N-1)$ can be extracted from the Regge SSA.

More recently, authors from the Symmetry journal constructed the exact SSA of three tachyons and one arbitrary string state, or the Lauricella SSA (LSSA)

$$A_{st}^{(r_{n}^{T},r_{m}^{P},r_{l}^{L})} =\prod_{n=1}\left[ -(n-1)!k_{3}^{T}\right] ^{r_{n}^{T}}\cdot\prod_{m=1}\left[ -(m-1)!k_{3} ^{P}\right] ^{r_{m}^{P}}\prod_{l=1}\left[ -(l-1)!k_{3}^{L}\right] ^{r_{l}^{L}}\cdot B\left( -\frac{t}{2}-1,-\frac{s}{2}-1\right) F_{D}^{(K)}\left( -\frac{t}{2}-1;R_{n}^{T},R_{m}^{P},R_{l}^{L};\frac{u}{2}+2-N;\tilde{Z}_{n} ^{T},\tilde{Z}_{m}^{P},\tilde{Z}_{l}^{L}\right)$$

in the $26D$ open bosonic string theory. In addition, they discovered the Lie algebra of the $SL(K+3,\mathbb{C})$ symmetry group

$$[E_{ij},E_{kl}]=\delta_{jk}E_{il}-\delta_{li}E_{kj}; 1\le i,j\le K+3$$

valid for all kinematic regimes of the LSSA. Moreover, the linear ratios presented above for the mass level $M^2=2(N-1)$ can be rederived by the LSSA in the hard scattering limit.
