= James Douglas Beason =

American physicist

James Douglas Beason, from the Air Force Research Laboratory, was awarded the status of Fellow of the American Physical Society after being nominated by the APS in 2000. The honor was for his advancement of national science policy, especially for his impact throughout the government on basic research. In addition, he has fundamentally advanced science in his work toward solving the relativistic Compton scattering kernel, and inventing innovative techniques for simulating lasers and plasmas.

== See also ==
- List of fellows of the American Physical Society (1998–2010)
