= Postulates of special relativity =

Concept in physics

Albert Einstein derived the theory of special relativity in 1905, from principles now called the postulates of special relativity. Einstein's formulation only requires two postulates, though his derivation implies a few more assumptions.

The idea that special relativity depended only on two postulates, both of which seemed to follow from the theory and experiment of the day, was one of the most compelling arguments for the correctness of the theory (Einstein 1912: "This theory is correct to the extent to which the two principles upon which it is based are correct. Since these seem to be correct to a great extent, ...")

== Postulates of special relativity ==
1. First postulate (principle of relativity)

The laws of physics take the same form in all inertial frames of reference.

2. Second postulate (invariance of c)

As measured in any inertial frame of reference, light is always propagated in empty space with a definite velocity c that is independent of the state of motion of the emitting body. Or: the speed of light in free space has the same value c in all inertial frames of reference.

The two-postulate basis for special relativity is the one historically used by Einstein, and it is sometimes the starting point today. As Einstein himself later acknowledged, the derivation of the Lorentz transformation tacitly makes use of some additional assumptions, including spatial homogeneity, isotropy, and memorylessness. Hermann Minkowski also implicitly used both postulates when he introduced the Minkowski space formulation, even though he showed that c can be seen as a space-time constant, and the identification with the speed of light is derived from optics.

== Alternative derivations of special relativity ==
Historically, Hendrik Lorentz and Henri Poincaré (1892–1905) derived the Lorentz transformation from Maxwell's equations, which served to explain the negative result of all aether drift measurements. By that the luminiferous aether becomes undetectable in agreement with what Poincaré called the principle of relativity (see History of Lorentz transformations and Lorentz ether theory). A more modern example of deriving the Lorentz transformation from electrodynamics (without using the historical aether concept at all), was given by Richard Feynman.

George Francis FitzGerald already made an argument similar to Einstein's in 1889, in response to the Michelson–Morley experiment seeming to show both postulates to be true. He wrote that a length contraction is "almost the only hypothesis that can reconcile" the apparent contradictions. Lorentz independently came to similar conclusions, and later wrote "the chief difference being that Einstein simply postulates what we have deduced".

Following these derivations, many alternative derivations have been proposed, based on various sets of assumptions. It has often been argued (such as by Vladimir Ignatowski in 1910, or Philipp Frank and Hermann Rothe in 1911, and many others in subsequent years) that a formula equivalent to the Lorentz transformation, up to a non-negative free parameter, follows from just the relativity postulate itself, without first postulating the universal light speed. These formulations rely on the aforementioned various assumptions such as isotropy. The numerical value of the parameter in these transformations can then be determined by experiment, just as the numerical values of the parameter pair c and the Vacuum permittivity are left to be determined by experiment even when using Einstein's original postulates. Experiment rules out the validity of the Galilean transformations. When the numerical values in both Einstein's and other approaches have been found then these different approaches result in the same theory.

== Insufficiency of the two standard postulates ==
Einstein's 1905 derivation is not complete. A break in Einstein's logic occurs where, after having established "the law of the constancy of the speed of light" for empty space, he invokes the law in situations where space is no longer empty. For the derivation to apply to physical objects requires an additional postulate or "bridging hypothesis", that the geometry derived for empty space also applies when a space is populated. This would be equivalent to stating that we know that the introduction of matter into a region, and its relative motion, have no effect on lightbeam geometry.

Such a statement would be problematic, as Einstein rejected the notion that a process such as light-propagation could be immune to other factors (1914: "There can be no doubt that this principle is of far-reaching significance; and yet, I cannot believe in its exact validity. It seems to me unbelievable that the course of any process (e.g., that of the propagation of light in a vacuum) could be conceived of as independent of all other events in the world.")

Including this "bridge" as an explicit third postulate might also have damaged the theory's credibility, as refractive index and the Fizeau effect would have suggested that the presence and behaviour of matter does seem to influence light-propagation, contra the theory. If this bridging hypothesis had been stated as a third postulate, it could have been claimed that the third postulate (and therefore the theory) were falsified by the experimental evidence.

== The 1905 system as "null theory" ==
Without a "bridging hypothesis" as a third postulate, the 1905 derivation is open to the criticism that its derived relationships may only apply in vacuo, that is, in the absence of matter.

The controversial suggestion that the 1905 theory, derived by assuming empty space, might only apply to empty space, appears in Edwin F. Taylor and John Archibald Wheeler's book "Spacetime Physics" (Box 3-1: "The Principle of Relativity Rests on Emptiness").

A similar suggestion that the reduction of GR geometry to SR's flat spacetime over small regions may be "unphysical" (because flat pointlike regions cannot contain matter capable of acting as physical observers) was acknowledged but rejected by Einstein in 1914 ("The equations of the new theory of relativity reduce to those of the original theory in the special case where the g_{μν} can be considered constant ... the sole objection that can be raised against the theory is that the equations we have set up might, perhaps, be void of any physical content. But no one is likely to think in earnest that this objection is justified in the present case").

Einstein revisited the problem in 1919 ("It is by no means settled a priori that a limiting transition of this kind has any possible meaning. For if gravitational fields do play an essential part in the structure of the particles of matter, the transition to the limiting case of constant g_{μν} would, for them, lose its justification, for indeed, with constant g_{μν} there could not be any particles of matter.")

A further argument for unphysicality can be gleaned from Einstein's solution to the "hole problem" under general relativity, in which Einstein rejects the physicality of coordinate-system relationships in truly empty space.

== Alternative relativistic models ==
Einstein's special theory is not the only theory that combines a form of light speed constancy with the relativity principle. A theory along the lines of that proposed by Heinrich Hertz (in 1890) allows for light to be fully dragged by all objects, giving local c-constancy for all physical observers. The logical possibility of a Hertzian theory shows that Einstein's two standard postulates (without the bridging hypothesis) are not sufficient to allow us to arrive uniquely at the solution of special relativity (although special relativity might be considered the most minimalist solution).

Einstein agreed that the Hertz theory was logically consistent ("It is on the basis of this hypothesis that Hertz developed an electrodynamics of moving bodies that is free of contradictions."), but dismissed it on the grounds of a poor agreement with the Fizeau result, leaving special relativity as the only remaining option. Given that SR was similarly unable to reproduce the Fizeau result without introducing additional auxiliary rules (to address the different behaviour of light in a particulate medium), this was perhaps not a fair comparison.

== Mathematical formulation of the postulates ==
In the rigorous mathematical formulation of special relativity, we suppose that the universe exists on a four-dimensional spacetime M. Individual points in spacetime are known as events; physical objects in spacetime are described by worldlines (if the object is a point particle) or worldsheets (if the object is larger than a point). The worldline or worldsheet only describes the motion of the object; the object may also have several other physical characteristics such as energy-momentum, mass, charge, etc.

In addition to events and physical objects, there are a class of inertial frames of reference. Each inertial frame of reference provides a coordinate system $(x_1,x_2,x_3,t)$ for events in the spacetime M. Furthermore, this frame of reference also gives coordinates to all other physical characteristics of objects in the spacetime; for instance, it will provide coordinates $(p_1,p_2,p_3,E)$ for the momentum and energy of an object, coordinates $(E_1,E_2,E_3,B_1,B_2,B_3)$ for an electromagnetic field, and so forth.

We assume that given any two inertial frames of reference, there exists a coordinate transformation that converts the coordinates from one frame of reference to the coordinates in another frame of reference. This transformation not only provides a conversion for spacetime coordinates $(x_1,x_2,x_3,t)$, but will also provide a conversion for all other physical coordinates, such as a conversion law for momentum and energy $(p_1,p_2,p_3,E)$, etc. (In practice, these conversion laws can be efficiently handled using the mathematics of tensors.)

We also assume that the universe obeys a number of physical laws. Mathematically, each physical law can be expressed with respect to the coordinates given by an inertial frame of reference by a mathematical equation (for instance, a differential equation) which relates the various coordinates of the various objects in the spacetime. A typical example is Maxwell's equations. Another is Newton's first law.

1. First Postulate (Principle of relativity)

Under transitions between inertial reference frames, the equations of all fundamental laws of physics stay form-invariant, while all the numerical constants entering these equations preserve their values. Thus, if a fundamental physical law is expressed with a mathematical equation in one inertial frame, it must be expressed by an identical equation in any other inertial frame, provided both frames are parameterised with charts of the same type. (The caveat on charts is relaxed, if we employ connections to write the law in a covariant form.)

2. Second Postulate (Invariance of c)

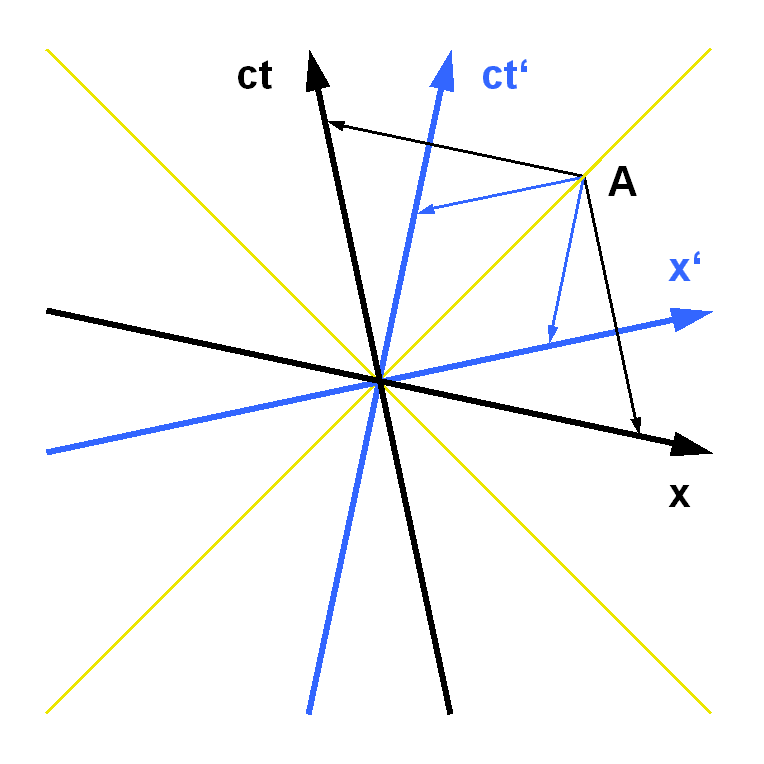
In the hyperbolic plane various speeds correspond to space and time units on conjugate diameters. Both the blue and the black axes are hyperbolic-orthogonal, so speed of light (yellow) computes to the same value.

There exists an absolute constant $0 < c < \infty$ with the following property. If A, B are two events which have coordinates $(x_1,x_2,x_3,t)$ and $(y_1,y_2,y_3,s)$ in one inertial frame $F$, and have coordinates $(x'_1,x'_2,x'_3,t')$ and $(y'_1,y'_2,y'_3,s')$ in another inertial frame $F'$, then

$\sqrt{(x_1-y_1)^2 + (x_2-y_2)^2 + (x_3-y_3)^2} = c(s-t) \quad$ if and only if $\quad \sqrt{(x'_1-y'_1)^2 + (x'_2-y'_2)^2 + (x'_3-y'_3)^2} = c(s'-t')$.

Informally, the Second Postulate asserts that objects travelling at speed c in one reference frame will necessarily travel at speed c in all reference frames. This postulate is a subset of the postulates that underlie Maxwell's equations in the interpretation given to them in the context of special relativity. However, Maxwell's equations rely on several other postulates, some of which are now known to be false (e.g., Maxwell's equations cannot account for the quantum attributes of electromagnetic radiation).

The second postulate can be used to imply a stronger version of itself, namely that the spacetime interval is invariant under changes of inertial reference frame. In the above notation, this means that

$$c^2 (s-t)^2 - (x_1-y_1)^2 - (x_2-y_2)^2 - (x_3-y_3)^2$$
$$= c^2 (s'-t')^2 - (x'_1-y'_1)^2 - (x'_2-y'_2)^2 - (x'_3-y'_3)^2$$

for any two events A, B. This can in turn be used to deduce the transformation laws between reference frames; see Lorentz transformation.

The postulates of special relativity can be expressed very succinctly using the mathematical language of pseudo-Riemannian manifolds. The second postulate is then an assertion that the four-dimensional spacetime M is a pseudo-Riemannian manifold equipped with a metric g of signature (1,3), which is given by the Minkowski metric when measured in each inertial reference frame. This metric is viewed as one of the physical quantities of the theory; thus it transforms in a certain manner when the frame of reference is changed, and it can be legitimately used in describing the laws of physics. The first postulate is an assertion that the laws of physics are invariant when represented in any frame of reference for which g is given by the Minkowski metric. One advantage of this formulation is that it is now easy to compare special relativity with general relativity, in which the same two postulates hold but the assumption that the metric is required to be Minkowski is dropped.

The theory of Galilean relativity is the limiting case of special relativity in the limit $c \to \infty$ (which is sometimes referred to as the non-relativistic limit). In this theory, the first postulate remains unchanged, but the second postulate is modified to:

If A, B are two events which have coordinates $(x_1,x_2,x_3,t)$ and $(y_1,y_2,y_3,s)$ in one inertial frame $F$, and have coordinates $(x'_1,x'_2,x'_3,t')$ and $(y'_1,y'_2,y'_3,s')$ in another inertial frame $F'$, then $s-t = s'-t'$. Furthermore, if $s-t=s'-t'=0$, then

$$\quad \sqrt{(x_1-y_1)^2 + (x_2-y_2)^2 + (x_3-y_3)^2}$$
$$= \sqrt{(x'_1-y'_1)^2 + (x'_2-y'_2)^2 + (x'_3-y'_3)^2}$$.

The physical theory given by classical mechanics, and Newtonian gravity is consistent with Galilean relativity, but not special relativity. Conversely, Maxwell's equations are not consistent with Galilean relativity unless one postulates the existence of a physical aether. In a number of cases, the laws of physics in special relativity (such as the equation $E=mc^2$) can be deduced by combining the postulates of special relativity with the hypothesis that the laws of special relativity approach the laws of classical mechanics in the non-relativistic limit.
