= Coordinate-free =

Mathematical methods that avoid coordinates

A coordinate-free, or component-free, treatment of a scientific theory or mathematical topic develops its concepts on any form of manifold without reference to any particular coordinate system.

== Benefits ==
Coordinate-free treatments generally allow for simpler systems of equations and inherently constrain certain types of inconsistency, allowing greater mathematical elegance at the cost of some abstraction from the detailed formulae needed to evaluate these equations within a particular system of coordinates.

In addition to elegance, coordinate-free treatments are crucial in certain applications for proving that a given definition is well formulated. For example, for a vector space $V$ with basis $v_1, ..., v_n$, it may be tempting to construct the dual space $V^*$ as the formal span of the symbols $v_1^*, ..., v_n^*$ with bracket $\langle \sum \alpha_i v_i , \sum \beta_i v_i^* \rangle := \sum \alpha_i \beta_i$, but it is not immediately clear that this construction is independent of the initial coordinate system chosen. Instead, it is best to construct $V^*$ as the space of linear functionals with bracket $\langle v, \varphi \rangle = \varphi(v)$, and then derive the coordinate-based formulae from this construction.

Nonetheless it may sometimes be too complicated to proceed from a coordinate-free treatment, or a coordinate-free treatment may guarantee uniqueness but not existence of the described object, or a coordinate-free treatment may simply not exist. As an example of the last situation, the mapping $v_i \mapsto v_i^*$ indicates a general isomorphism between a finite-dimensional vector space and its dual, but this isomorphism is not attested to by any coordinate-free definition. As an example of the second situation, a common way of constructing the fiber product of schemes involves gluing along affine patches. To alleviate the inelegance of this construction, the fiber product is then characterized by a convenient universal property, and proven to be independent of the initial affine patches chosen.

== History ==
Coordinate-free treatments were the only available approach to geometry (and are now known as synthetic geometry) before the development of analytic geometry by Descartes. After several centuries of generally coordinate-based exposition, the modern tendency is generally to introduce students to coordinate-free treatments early on, and then to derive the coordinate-based treatments from the coordinate-free treatment, rather than vice versa.

== Applications ==
Fields that are now often introduced with coordinate-free treatments include vector calculus, tensors, differential geometry, and computer graphics.

In physics, the existence of coordinate-free treatments of physical theories is a corollary of the principle of general covariance.

== See also ==
- General covariance
- Foundations of geometry
- Change of basis
- Coordinate conditions
- Component-free treatment of tensors
- Background independence
- Pointless topology
