= List of textbooks in physics =

Physics textbooks List

List of textbooks in physics:

- Category:Physics textbooks
- List of textbooks on classical mechanics and quantum mechanics
- List of textbooks in electromagnetism
- List of textbooks on relativity
- List of textbooks in thermodynamics and statistical mechanics
