= Harmonic coordinate condition =

Coordinate condition in general relativity

The harmonic coordinate condition is one of several coordinate conditions in general relativity, which make it possible to solve the Einstein field equations. A coordinate system is said to satisfy the harmonic coordinate condition if each of the coordinate functions $x^\alpha$ (regarded as scalar fields) satisfies d'Alembert's wave equation. The parallel notion of a harmonic coordinate system in Riemannian geometry is a coordinate system whose defining functions are harmonic, meaning they satisfy Laplace's equation. Since d'Alembert's equation is the generalization of Laplace's equation to spacetime, its solutions are also called harmonic.

== Motivation ==
The laws of physics can be expressed in a generally invariant form. In other words, the real world does not care about our coordinate systems. However, for us to be able to solve the equations, we must fix upon a particular coordinate system. A coordinate condition selects one (or a smaller set of) such coordinate system(s). The Cartesian coordinates used in special relativity satisfy d'Alembert's equation, so a harmonic coordinate system is the closest approximation available in general relativity to an inertial frame of reference in special relativity.

== Derivation ==
In general relativity, we have to use the covariant derivative instead of the partial derivative in d'Alembert's equation, so we get:

$$0 = \left(x^\alpha\right)_{; \beta ; \gamma} g^{\beta \gamma} = \left(\left(x^\alpha\right)_{, \beta , \gamma} - \left(x^\alpha\right)_{, \sigma} \Gamma^{\sigma}_{\beta \gamma}\right) g^{\beta \gamma} \,.$$

Since the coordinate x^{α} is not actually a scalar, this is not a tensor equation. That is, it is not generally invariant. But coordinate conditions must not be generally invariant because they are supposed to pick out (only work for) certain coordinate systems and not others. Since the partial derivative of a coordinate is the Kronecker delta, we get:

$$0 = \left(\delta^\alpha_{\beta , \gamma} - \delta^\alpha_{\sigma} \Gamma^{\sigma}_{\beta \gamma}\right) g^{\beta \gamma} = \left(0 - \Gamma^{\alpha}_{\beta \gamma}\right) g^{\beta \gamma} = - \Gamma^{\alpha}_{\beta \gamma} g^{\beta \gamma} \,.$$

And thus, dropping the minus sign, we get the harmonic coordinate condition (also known as the de Donder gauge after Théophile de Donder):

$$0 = \Gamma^{\alpha}_{\beta \gamma} g^{\beta \gamma} \,.$$

This condition is especially useful when working with gravitational waves.

== Alternative form ==
Consider the covariant derivative of the density of the reciprocal of the metric tensor:

$$0 = \left(g^{\mu \nu} \sqrt {-g}\right)_{; \rho} = \left(g^{\mu \nu} \sqrt {-g}\right)_{, \rho} + g^{\sigma \nu} \Gamma^{\mu}_{\sigma \rho} \sqrt {-g} + g^{\mu \sigma} \Gamma^{\nu}_{\sigma \rho} \sqrt {-g} -  g^{\mu \nu} \Gamma^{\sigma}_{\sigma \rho} \sqrt {-g} \,.$$

The last term $- g^{\mu \nu} \Gamma^{\sigma}_{\sigma \rho} \sqrt {-g}$ emerges because $\sqrt {-g}$ is not an invariant scalar, and so its covariant derivative is not the same as its ordinary derivative. Rather, $\sqrt {-g}_{; \rho} = 0$ because ${{{1}}}$, while $\sqrt {-g}_{, \rho} = \sqrt {-g} \Gamma^{\sigma}_{\sigma \rho}$.

Contracting ν with ρ and applying the harmonic coordinate condition to the second term, we get:

$$\begin{align}
0 &= \left(g^{\mu \nu} \sqrt {-g}\right)_{, \nu} + g^{\sigma \nu} \Gamma^{\mu}_{\sigma \nu} \sqrt {-g} + g^{\mu \sigma} \Gamma^{\nu}_{\sigma \nu} \sqrt {-g} -  g^{\mu \nu} \Gamma^{\sigma}_{\sigma \nu} \sqrt {-g} \,\\
&= \left(g^{\mu \nu} \sqrt {-g}\right)_{, \nu} + 0 + g^{\mu \alpha} \Gamma^{\beta}_{\alpha \beta} \sqrt {-g} -  g^{\mu \alpha} \Gamma^{\beta}_{\beta \alpha} \sqrt {-g} \,.
\end{align}$$

Thus, we get that an alternative way of expressing the harmonic coordinate condition is:

$$0 = \left(g^{\mu \nu} \sqrt {-g}\right)_{, \nu} \,.$$

== More variant forms ==
If one expresses the Christoffel symbol in terms of the metric tensor, one gets

$$0 = \Gamma^{\alpha}_{\beta \gamma} g^{\beta \gamma} = \frac{1}{2} g^{\alpha \delta} \left( g_{\gamma \delta , \beta} + g_{\beta \delta , \gamma} - g_{\beta \gamma , \delta} \right) g^{\beta \gamma} \,.$$

Discarding the factor of $g^{\alpha \delta}$ and rearranging some indices and terms, one gets

$$g_{\alpha \beta , \gamma} \, g^{\beta \gamma} = \frac{1}{2} g_{\beta \gamma , \alpha} \, g^{\beta \gamma} \,.$$

In the context of linearized gravity, this is indistinguishable from these additional forms:

$$\begin{align}
h_{\alpha \beta , \gamma} \, g^{\beta \gamma} &= \frac12 h_{\beta \gamma , \alpha} \, g^{\beta \gamma} \,; \\
g_{\alpha \beta , \gamma} \, \eta^{\beta \gamma} &= \frac12 g_{\beta \gamma , \alpha} \, \eta^{\beta \gamma} \,; \\
h_{\alpha \beta , \gamma} \, \eta^{\beta \gamma} &= \frac12 h_{\beta \gamma , \alpha} \, \eta^{\beta \gamma} \,.
\end{align}$$

However, the last two are a different coordinate condition when you go to the second order in $h$.

== Effect on the wave equation ==
For example, consider the wave equation applied to the electromagnetic vector potential:

$$0 = A_{\alpha ; \beta ; \gamma} g^{\beta \gamma} \,.$$

Let us evaluate the right hand side:

$$A_{\alpha ; \beta ; \gamma} g^{\beta \gamma} = A_{\alpha ; \beta , \gamma} g^{\beta \gamma} - A_{\sigma ; \beta} \Gamma^{\sigma}_{\alpha \gamma} g^{\beta \gamma} - A_{\alpha ; \sigma} \Gamma^{\sigma}_{\beta \gamma} g^{\beta \gamma} \,.$$

Using the harmonic coordinate condition we can eliminate the right-most term and then continue evaluation as follows:

$$\begin{align}
A_{\alpha ; \beta ; \gamma} g^{\beta \gamma}
&= A_{\alpha ; \beta , \gamma} g^{\beta \gamma} - A_{\sigma ; \beta} \Gamma^{\sigma}_{\alpha \gamma} g^{\beta \gamma} \\
&= A_{\alpha , \beta , \gamma} g^{\beta \gamma} - A_{\rho , \gamma} \Gamma^{\rho}_{\alpha \beta}  g^{\beta \gamma} - A_{\rho} \Gamma^{\rho}_{\alpha \beta , \gamma} g^{\beta \gamma}
- A_{\sigma , \beta} \Gamma^{\sigma}_{\alpha \gamma} g^{\beta \gamma}
- A_{\rho} \Gamma^{\rho}_{\sigma \beta} \Gamma^{\sigma}_{\alpha \gamma} g^{\beta \gamma} \,.
\end{align}$$

== See also ==
- General covariance
- Lorenz gauge condition
