= Non-relativistic general relativity =

Effective theory of gravity

In physics, non-relativistic general relativity is an approximate approach to modeling gravity based on applying effective field theory. Effective field theory treats gravitational interactions between point particles, adapting techniques developed for quantum field theory. The first systematic treatment was by Walter D. Goldberger and Ira Rothstein in 2006. The approach lead to a systematic application of Feynman diagrams to higher order post-Newtonian expansions and a Kaluza-Klein like decomposition of general relativity. The primary application is gravitational waves from inspiraling compact objects like black holes.

== Effective field theory ==
In the post-Newtonian approximation for a two body gravitational system, like a pair of inspiralling black holes, different physical effects dominate at different length scales. The black hole itself has a characteristic internal structure radius, its Schwarzschild radius, $r_s$. A pair of black holes have a length scale, their separation distance, $r$. As long as $r \gg r_s$ the orbital velocity, $v$, will be small compared to the speed of light and Newtonian gravity will be a good approximation. The motion of the black holes generates gravitational waves with characteristic wavelength, $\lambda \approx v/r$.

In effective field theory (EFT), the full problem is solved in two stages. In the first stage, the gravitational field of each individual black hole is represented by the field of point particles out to the orbital radius $r$. In this stage, the physics of a Schwarzschild black hole and its gravitational radiation field is matched to a point particle and its radiation field. The details of the black hole are summarized or integrated into parameters of the point-particle field.

In the second stage, the bound state of two point particles is matched to bound state potential modes and long range radiation modes of an effective field for a composite object with a size $r$. The radiation from this two-particle bound state is identified with gravitational waves as long as their wavelength is long compared with the distance between the particles, $r \ll \lambda$.

== Kaluza-Klein like decomposition ==
One result from the application of effective theory to general relativity was a decomposition of general relativity into several non-relativistic gravitational fields similar to the model proposed by Kaluza-Klein theory. Within general relativity (GR), Einstein's relativistic gravity, the gravitational field is described by the 10-component metric tensor. In a completely non-relativistic limit 9 fields can be ignored leaving only a single component Newtonian gravitational potential characteristic of Newtonian gravity. The concept of non-relativistic gravitational fields attempts to give physical interpretation to these nine fields.

A reader who is familiar with electromagnetism (EM) will benefit from the following analogy. In EM, one is familiar with the electrostatic potential $\phi^\text{EM}$ and the magnetic vector potential $\vec{A}{}^\text{EM}$. Together, they combine into the 4-vector potential $A_\mu^\text{EM} \leftrightarrow (\phi^\text{EM}, \vec{A}{}^\text{EM})$, which is compatible with relativity. This relation can be thought to represent the non-relativistic decomposition of the electromagnetic 4-vector potential. Indeed, a system of point-particle charges moving slowly with respect to the speed of light may be studied in an expansion in $v^2/c^2$, where $v$ is a typical velocity and $c$ is the speed of light. This expansion is known as the post-Coulombic expansion. Within this expansion, $\phi^\text{EM}$ contributes to the two-body potential already at 0th order, while $\vec{A}^\text{EM}$ contributes only from the 1st order and onward, since it couples to electric currents and hence the associated potential is proportional to $v^2/c^2$.

=== Non-relativistic gravitational field expansion ===
In the non-relativistic limit, of weak gravity and non-relativistic velocities, general relativity reduces to Newtonian gravity. Going beyond the strict limit, corrections can be organized into a perturbation theory known as the post-Newtonian expansion. In one approach to that expansion, the metric gravitational field $g_{\mu\nu},\ \mu, \nu = 0, 1, 2, 3$, is redefined and decomposed into the non-relativistic gravitational (NRG) fields $g_{\mu\nu} \leftrightarrow \big(\phi, \vec{A}, \sigma_{ij}\big)$ : $\phi$ is the Newtonian potential, $\vec{A}$ is known as the gravito-magnetic vector potential, and finally $\sigma_{ij}$ is a 3d symmetric tensor known as the spatial metric perturbation. The field redefinition is given by
$$ds^2\equiv g_{\mu \nu}dx^\mu dx^\nu = e^{2 \phi}(dt-2\, \vec{A} \cdot d\vec{x})^2-e^{-2 \phi}(\delta_{ij} + \sigma_{ij})\, dx^i\, dx^j.$$
In components, this is equivalent to
$$\begin{align}
g_{00} &= e^{2 \phi}, \\
g_{0i} &= -2\, e^{2 \phi} \, A_i, \\
g_{ij} &= -e^{-2 \phi}\, (\delta_{ij} + \sigma_{ij}) + 4 \, e^{2 \phi} \,A_i \, A_j,
\end{align}$$
where $i, j = 1, 2, 3$.

Counting components, $g_{\mu\nu}$ has 10, while $\phi$ has 1, $\vec{A}$ has 3 and finally $\sigma_{ij}$ has 6. Hence, in terms of components, the decomposition reads $10 = 1 + 3 + 6$.

=== Motivation for definition ===
In the post-Newtonian limit, bodies move slowly compared with the speed of light, and hence the gravitational field is also slowly changing. Approximating the fields to be time independent, the Kaluza-Klein reduction (KK) was adapted to apply to the time direction. The NRG decomposition is a Kaluza-Klein reduction over time.

=== Relation with standard approximations ===
By definition, the post-Newtonian expansion assumes a weak field approximation. Within the first order perturbation to the metric $g_{\mu \nu} = \eta_{\mu \nu} + h_{\mu \nu}$, where $\eta_{\mu \nu}$ is the Minkowski metric, we find the standard weak field decomposition into a scalar, vector and tensor $h_{\mu\nu} \to \left( h_{00}, h_{0i}, h_{ij} \right)$, which is similar to the non-relativistic gravitational (NRG) fields. The importance of the NRG fields is that they provide a non-linear extension, thereby facilitating computation at higher orders in the weak field / post-Newtonian expansion. Summarizing, the NRG fields are adapted for higher order post-Newtonian expansion.

=== Physical interpretation ===
In the 1st post-Newtonian order, the components of the expansion can be identified with physical effects. The scalar field $\phi$ is interpreted as the Newtonian gravitational potential. The vector field $\vec{A}$ is interpreted as the gravito-magnetic vector potential. It is analogous to the magnetic vector potential in electromagnetism (EM). In particular, it is sourced by momentum, a mass-current, and the analogue of charge-currents in EM.

The gravito-magnetic vector potential is responsible for current-current interaction. It generates a repulsive contribution to the force between parallel mass-currents. However, this repulsion is dominated by the zeroth-order Newtonian gravitational attraction, since in gravity a current "wire" must always be massive (charged) -- unlike EM.

A spinning object is the analogue of an electromagnetic current loop. Thus a spinning mass creates a dipole field in $\vec{A}$ resembling a magnetic dipole.

Stopping the expansion at 1st post-Newtonian order means the symmetric tensor $\sigma_{ij}$ is ignored, and gravity is approximated by the $\phi$, $\vec{A}$ fields. At this expansion level the approximation is a strong analogue of electromagnetism, an analogy known as gravitoelectromagnetism.

== Applications and generalizations ==
The two body problem in general relativity holds both intrinsic interest and observational, astrophysical interest. In particular, it is used to describe the motion of binary compact objects, which are the sources for gravitational waves. As such, the study of this problem is essential for both detection and interpretation of gravitational waves.

Within this two body problem, the effects of GR are captured by the two body effective potential, which is expanded within the post-Newtonian approximation. Non-relativistic gravitational fields were found to economize the determination of this two body effective potential.

== See also ==
- Non-relativistic spacetime
