= Principle of covariance =

Principle in relativity

In physics, the principle of covariance emphasizes formulating physical laws using only those quantities whose measurements can be unambiguously correlated by observers in different frames of reference.

Mathematically, the physical quantities must transform covariantly, that is, under a certain representation of the group of coordinate transformations between admissible frames of reference of the physical theory. This group is referred to as the covariance group.

The principle of covariance does not require the physical laws to be invariant under the group of admissible transformations, although in most cases the equations are indeed invariant. However, in the theory of weak interactions, the equations are not invariant under reflections (but are, of course, still covariant).

== Covariance in Newtonian mechanics ==
In Newtonian mechanics the admissible frames of reference are inertial frames with relative velocities much smaller than the speed of light. Time is then absolute, and the transformations between admissible frames of references are Galilean transformations, which (together with rotations, translations, and reflections) form the Galilean group. The covariant physical quantities are Euclidean scalars, vectors, and tensors. An example of a covariant equation is Newton's second law,
$$m\frac{d\vec{v}}{dt} = \vec{F},$$
where the covariant quantities are the mass $m$ of a moving body (scalar), the velocity $\vec{v}$ of the body (vector), the force $\vec{F}$ acting on the body, and the invariant time $t$.

== Covariance in special relativity ==
In special relativity the admissible frames of reference are all inertial frames. The transformations between frames are the Lorentz transformations, which (together with the rotations, translations, and reflections) form the Poincaré group. The covariant quantities are scalars, four-vectors etc., of the Minkowski space (and also more complicated objects like Dirac spinors and others). An example of a covariant equation is the Lorentz force equation of motion of a charged particle in an electromagnetic field (a generalization of Newton's second law)
$$m\frac{du^a}{ds} = qF^{ab} u_b,$$
where $m$ and $q$ are the mass and charge of the particle (invariant scalars); $ds$ is the invariant interval (scalar); $u^a$ is the 4-velocity (4-vector); and $F^{ab}$ is the electromagnetic field strength tensor (4-tensor).

== Covariance in general relativity ==
In general relativity, the admissible frames of reference are all reference frames. The transformations between frames are all arbitrary (invertible and differentiable) coordinate transformations. The covariant quantities are scalar fields, vector fields, tensor fields etc., defined on spacetime considered as a manifold. Main example of covariant equation is the Einstein field equations.

== See also ==
- Principle of relativity
- Lorentz covariance
- General covariance
