= Non-relativistic spacetime =

In physics, a non-relativistic spacetime is any mathematical model that fuses n-dimensional space and m-dimensional time into a single continuum other than the (3+1) model used in relativity theory.

In the sense used in this article, a spacetime is deemed "non-relativistic" if (a) it deviates from (3+1) dimensionality, even if the postulates of special or general relativity are otherwise satisfied, or if (b) it does not obey the postulates of special or general relativity, regardless of the model's dimensionality.

== Introduction ==
There are many reasons why spacetimes may be studied that do not satisfy relativistic postulates and/or that deviate from the apparent (3+1) dimensionality of the known universe.

=== Galilean/Newtonian spacetime ===
The classic example of a non-relativistic spacetime is the spacetime of Galileo and Newton. It is the spacetime of everyday "common sense". Galilean/Newtonian spacetime assumes that space is Euclidean (i.e. "flat"), and that time has a constant rate of passage that is independent of the state of motion of an observer, or indeed of anything external.

Newtonian mechanics takes place within the context of Galilean/Newtonian spacetime. For a huge problem set, the results of computations using Newtonian mechanics are only imperceptibly different from computations using a relativistic model. Since computations using Newtonian mechanics are considerably simpler than those using relativistic mechanics, as well as correspond to intuition, most everyday mechanics problems are solved using Newtonian mechanics.

=== Model systems ===
Efforts since 1930 to develop a consistent quantum theory of gravity have not yet produced more than tentative results. The study of quantum gravity is difficult for multiple reasons. Technically, general relativity is a complex, nonlinear theory. Very few problems of significant interest admit of analytical solution, and numerical solutions in the strong-field realm can require immense amounts of supercomputer time.

Conceptual issues present an even greater difficulty, since general relativity states that gravity is a consequence of the geometry of spacetime. To produce a quantum theory of gravity would therefore require quantizing the basic units of measurement themselves: space and time. A completed theory of quantum gravity would undoubtedly present a visualization of the Universe unlike any that has hitherto been imagined.

One promising research approach is to explore the features of simplified models of quantum gravity that present fewer technical difficulties while retaining the fundamental conceptual features of the full-fledged model. In particular, general relativity in reduced dimensions (2+1) retains the same basic structure of the full (3+1) theory, but is technically far simpler. Multiple research groups have adopted this approach to studying quantum gravity.

=== "New physics" theories ===
The idea that relativistic theory could be usefully extended with the introduction of extra dimensions originated with Nordstöm's 1914 modification of his previous 1912 and 1913 theories of gravitation. In this modification, he added an additional dimension resulting in a 5-dimensional vector theory. Kaluza–Klein theory (1921) was an attempt to unify relativity theory with electromagnetism. Although at first enthusiastically welcomed by physicists such as Einstein, Kaluza–Klein theory was too beset with inconsistencies to be a viable theory.

Various superstring theories have effective low-energy limits that correspond to classical spacetimes with alternate dimensionalities than the apparent dimensionality of the observed universe. It has been argued that all but the (3+1) dimensional world represent dead worlds with no observers. Therefore, on the basis of anthropic arguments, it would be predicted that the observed universe should be one of (3+1) spacetime.

Space and time may not be fundamental properties, but rather may represent emergent phenomena whose origins lie in quantum entanglement.

It had occasionally been wondered whether it is possible to derive sensible laws of physics in a universe with more than one time dimension. Early attempts at constructing spacetimes with extra timelike dimensions inevitably met with issues such as causality violation and so could be immediately rejected, but it is now known that viable frameworks exist of such spacetimes that can be correlated with general relativity and the Standard Model, and which make predictions of new phenomena that are within the range of experimental access.

=== Possible observational evidence ===
Observed high values of the cosmological constant may imply kinematics significantly different from relativistic kinematics. A deviation from relativistic kinematics would have significant cosmological implications in regards to such puzzles as the "missing mass" problem.

To date, general relativity has satisfied all experimental tests. However, proposals that may lead to a quantum theory of gravity (such as string theory and loop quantum gravity) generically predict violations of the weak equivalence principle in the 10^{−13} to 10^{−18} range. Currently envisioned tests of the weak equivalence principle are approaching a degree of sensitivity such that non-discovery of a violation would be just as profound a result as discovery of a violation. Non-discovery of equivalence principle violation in this range would suggest that gravity is so fundamentally different from other forces as to require a major reevaluation of current attempts to unify gravity with the other forces of nature. A positive detection, on the other hand, would provide a major guidepost towards unification.

=== Condensed matter physics ===
Research on condensed matter has spawned a two-way relationship between spacetime physics and condensed matter physics:

- On the one hand, spacetime approaches have been used to investigate certain condensed matter phenomena. For example, spacetimes with local non-relativistic symmetries have been investigated capable of supporting massive matter fields. This approach has been used to investigate the details of matter couplings, transport phenomena, and the thermodynamics of non-relativistic fluids.
- On the other hand, condensed matter systems can be used to mimic certain aspects of general relativity. Although intrinsically non-relativistic, these systems provide models of curved spacetime quantum field theory that are experimentally accessible. The include acoustical models in flowing fluids, Bose–Einstein condensate systems, or quasiparticles in moving superfluids, such as the quasiparticles and domain walls of the A-phase of superfluid He-3.

== See also ==
- Non-relativistic gravitational fields
