= Background independence =

Concept of universality in physical science

Background independence is a condition in theoretical physics that requires the defining equations of a theory to be independent of the actual shape of the spacetime and the value of various fields within the spacetime. In particular this means that it must be possible not to refer to a specific coordinate system—the theory must be coordinate-free. In addition, the different spacetime configurations (or backgrounds) should be obtained as different solutions of the underlying equations.

== Description ==
Background independence is a loosely defined property of a theory of physics. Roughly speaking, it limits the number of mathematical structures used to describe space and time that are put in place "by hand". Instead, these structures are the result of dynamical equations, such as Einstein field equations, so that one can determine from first principles what form they should take. Since the form of the metric determines the result of calculations, a theory with background independence is more predictive than a theory without it, since the theory requires fewer inputs to make its predictions. This is analogous to desiring fewer free parameters in a fundamental theory.

So background independence can be seen as extending the mathematical objects that should be predicted from theory to include not just the parameters, but also geometrical structures. Summarizing this, Rickles writes: "Background structures are contrasted with dynamical ones, and a background independent theory only possesses the latter type—obviously, background dependent theories are those possessing the former type in addition to the latter type."

In general relativity, background independence is identified with the property that the metric of spacetime is the solution of a dynamical equation. In classical mechanics, this is not the case, the metric is fixed by the physicist to match experimental observations. This is undesirable, since the form of the metric impacts the physical predictions, but is not itself predicted by the theory.

== Manifest background independence ==
Manifest background independence is primarily an aesthetic rather than a physical requirement. It is analogous and closely related to requiring in differential geometry that equations be written in a form that is independent of the choice of charts and coordinate embeddings. If a background-independent formalism is present, it can lead to simpler and more elegant equations. However, there is no physical content in requiring that a theory be manifestly background-independent – for example, the equations of general relativity can be rewritten in local coordinates without affecting the physical implications.

Although making a property manifest is only aesthetic, it is a useful tool for making sure the theory actually has that property. For example, if a theory is written in a manifestly Lorentz-invariant way, one can check at every step to be sure that Lorentz invariance is preserved. Making a property manifest also makes it clear whether or not the theory actually has that property. The inability to make classical mechanics manifestly Lorentz-invariant does not reflect a lack of imagination on the part of the theorist, but rather a physical feature of the theory. The same goes for making classical mechanics or electromagnetism background-independent.

== Theories of quantum gravity ==
Because of the speculative nature of quantum-gravity research, there is much debate as to the correct implementation of background independence. Ultimately, the answer is to be decided by experiment, but until experiments can probe quantum-gravity phenomena, physicists have to settle for debate. Below is a brief summary of the two largest quantum-gravity approaches.

Physicists have studied models of 3D quantum gravity, which is a much simpler problem than 4D quantum gravity (this is because in 3D, quantum gravity has no local degrees of freedom). In these models, there are non-zero transition amplitudes between two different topologies, or in other words, the topology changes. This and other similar results lead physicists to believe that any consistent quantum theory of gravity should include topology change as a dynamical process.

=== String theory ===
String theory is usually formulated with perturbation theory around a fixed background. While it is possible that the theory defined this way is locally background-invariant, if so, it is not manifest, and it is not clear what the exact meaning is. One attempt to formulate string theory in a manifestly background-independent fashion is string field theory, but little progress has been made in understanding it.

Another approach is the conjectured, but yet unproven AdS/CFT duality, which is believed to provide a full, non-perturbative definition of string theory in spacetimes with anti-de Sitter asymptotics. If so, this could describe a kind of superselection sector of the putative background-independent theory. But it would still be restricted to anti-de Sitter space asymptotics, which disagrees with the current observations of our Universe. A full non-perturbative definition of the theory in arbitrary spacetime backgrounds is still lacking.

Topology change is an established process in string theory.

=== Loop quantum gravity ===
A very different approach to quantum gravity called loop quantum gravity is fully non-perturbative and manifestly background-independent: geometric quantities, such as area, are predicted without reference to a background metric or asymptotics (e.g. no need for a background metric or anti-de Sitter asymptotics), only a given topology.

== See also ==
- Causal dynamical triangulation
- Coordinate-free
- General covariance
- Quantum field theory
