= List of textbooks on relativity =

Textbooks on the theory of relativity have been published by several notable physicists and mathematicians:

== Special relativity ==
The primary sources section of the latter article in particular contains many additional (early) publications of importance in the field.

- Lorentz, Hendrik (1892). "De relatieve beweging van de aarde en den aether". Zittingsverlag Akad. (in Dutch). 5 (1): 74–79.

:For a translation see: s:Translation:The Relative Motion of the Earth and the Aether. Hendrik Lorentz was a major influence on Einstein's theory of special relativity. Lorentz laid the fundamentals for the work by Einstein and the theory was originally called the Lorentz-Einstein theory. After 1905 Lorentz wrote several papers on what he called "Einstein's principle of relativity".

- Einstein, Albert (1905-06-30). "Zur Elektrodynamik bewegter Körper" [On the Electrodynamics of Moving Bodies]. Annalen der Physik (in German). 17 (10): 891–921. Bibcode:1905AnP...322..891E. doi:10.1002/andp.19053221004.
  - "On the Electrodynamics of Moving Bodies". Translation by George Barker Jeffery and Wilfrid Perrett in The Principle of Relativity, London: Methuen and Company, Ltd. (1923)
  - "On the Electrodynamics of Moving Bodies". Translation by Megh Nad Saha in The Principle of Relativity: Original Papers by A. Einstein and H. Minkowski, University of Calcutta, 1920, pp. 1–34:

:Introduced the special theory of relativity. Reconciled Maxwell's equations for electricity and magnetism with the laws of mechanics by introducing major changes to mechanics close to the speed of light. One of the Annus Mirabilis papers.

- Einstein, Albert (1905). "Ist die Trägheit eines Körpers von seinem Energieinhalt abhängig?" (PDF). Annalen der Physik. 18 (13): 639–641. Bibcode:1905AnP...323..639E. doi:10.1002/andp.19053231314.

:English translations: "Does the Inertia of a Body Depend Upon Its Energy Content?". Translation by George Barker Jeffery and Wilfrid Perrett in The Principle of Relativity, London: Methuen and Company, Ltd. (1923). :Used the newly formulated theory of special relativity to introduce the mass energy formula. One of the Annus Mirabilis papers.

- Henri Poincaré (1906) "On the Dynamics of the Electron", Rendiconti del Circolo Matematico di Palermo
- Minkowski, Hermann (1915) [1907]. "Das Relativitätsprinzip" [The Relativity Principle]. Annalen der Physik (in German). 352 (15): 927–938. Bibcode:1915AnP...352..927M. doi:10.1002/andp.19153521505.

* —— (21 December 1907). "Die Grundgleichungen für die elektromagnetischen Vorgänge in bewegten Körpern" . Nachrichten von der Gesellschaft der Wissenschaften zu Göttingen, Mathematisch-Physikalische Klasse: 53–111. **English translation: The Fundamental Equations for Electromagnetic Processes in Moving Bodies. In: The Principle of Relativity (1920), Calcutta: University Press, 1-69

- —— (21 September 1908). "Raum und Zeit" . Physikalische Zeitschrift. 10: 75–88.

** Translation by Meghnad Saha, "Space and Time" (1920): Wikisource link. : Introduced the four-vector notation and the notion of Minkowski space, which was later adopted by Einstein and others.

- E. T. Whittaker (1910) A History of the Theories of Aether and Electricity
- Wilson, Edwin B.; Lewis, Gilbert N. (1912). "The Space-time Manifold of Relativity. The Non-Euclidean Geometry of Mechanics and Electromagnetics". Proceedings of the American Academy of Arts and Sciences. 48 (11): 387–507. doi:10.2307/20022840. JSTOR 20022840.
- Varićak, V. (1912), "Über die nichteuklidische Interpretation der Relativtheorie" , Jahresbericht der Deutschen Mathematiker-Vereinigung, 21: 103–127, Wikisource translation: On the Non-Euclidean Interpretation of the Theory of Relativity
- Henri Poincaré (1913) "The New Mechanics", The Monist Vol. XXIII, "The Relativity of Space", The Monist, Vol. XXIII.
- Émile Borel (1914) Introduction Géométrique à quelques Théories Physiques, Gauthier-Villars
- Silberstein, Ludwik (1914). The Theory of Relativity. Cambridge University Press. Used concepts developed in the then-current textbooks (e.g., vector analysis and non-Euclidean geometry) to provide entry into mathematical physics with a vector-based introduction to quaternions and a primer on matrix notation for linear transformations of 4-vectors. The ten chapters are composed of 4 on kinematics, 3 on quaternion methods, and 3 on electromagnetism. Silberstein used biquaternions to develop Minkowski space and Lorentz transformations.
- Arthur W. Conway (1915) Relativity via Internet Archive
- Ebenezer Cunningham (1914) The Principle of Relativity and (1915) Relativity and the Electron Theory
- Alfred North Whitehead (1919) An Enquiry concerning the Principles of Natural Knowledge, (1922) The Principle of Relativity with Applications to Physical Science
- Clement Durell (1926) Readable Relativity
- Hans Reichenbach (1928) Philosophie der Raum-Zeit-Lehre. English translation: Maria Reichenbach, 1957, The Philosophy of Space and Time. Dover. ISBN 0-486-60443-8
- Frank Morley (1936), "When and Where", The Criterion, edited by Thomas Stearns Eliot, volume 15, pages 200-209.
- Vladimir Karapetoff (1944) "The special theory of relativity in hyperbolic functions", Reviews of Modern Physics 16:33–52, Abstract & link to pdf
- Lanczos, Cornelius (1949), The Variational Principles of Mechanics, University of Toronto Press, pp. 304–312 Also used biquaternions.
- David Hestenes (1966) Space-Time Algebra, 2nd ed., Birkhäuser, 2015, ISBN 978-3319184128
- French, Anthony (1968). Special Relativity. W. W. Norton & Company. Google Books preview
- Qadir, Asghar (1989). Relativity: An Introduction to the Special Theory. Singapore: World Scientific Publications. Bibcode:1989rist.book.....Q. ISBN 978-9971-5-0612-4.
- Taylor, Edwin F.; Wheeler, John Archibald (1992). Spacetime Physics: Introduction to Special Relativity (2nd ed.). W. H. Freeman. ISBN 978-0-7167-2327-1.
- N. David Mermin (2005) It's About Time: Understanding Einstein's Relativity, Princeton University Press ISBN 978-0-691-12201-4

== General relativity ==
- Einstein, Albert (1916). "Die Grundlage der allgemeinen Relativitätstheorie" [The Foundation of the General Theory of Relativity] (PDF). Annalen der Physik (in German). 354 (7): 769–822. Bibcode:1916AnP...354..769E. doi:10.1002/andp.19163540702. Archived from the original (PDF) on 2006-08-23.

: This publication is the first complete account of a general relativistic theory.

- Hermann Weyl (1918) Raum, Zeit, Materie. 5 edns. to 1922 ed. with notes by Jūrgen Ehlers, 1980. trans. 4th edn. Henry Brose, 1922 Space Time Matter, Methuen, rept. 1952 Dover. ISBN 0-486-60267-2.
- Max Born (1920) Die Relativitätstheorie Einsteins und ihre physikalischen Grundlagen (in German). Berlin: Springer. 1920. – Based on Born's lectures at the University of Frankfurt am Main.
  - Available in English under the title Einstein's theory of relativity. New York: Dutton. 1922..
- Ebenezer Cunningham (1921) Relativity, Electron Theory and Gravitation, second edition
- Alfred North Whitehead (1922) The Principle of Relativity with applications to Physical Science
- Francis Dominic Murnaghan (1922) Vector Analysis and the Theory of Relativity, Johns Hopkins University Press @ Internet Archive
- Eddington, Arthur Stanley (1923). The Mathematical Theory of Relativity. Cambridge University Press. Einstein considered this the finest description of the theory of relativity in any language.
- Charles Steinmetz (1923) Four Lectures on Relativity and Space
- Ludwik Silberstein (1924) The Theory of Relativity, 2nd edition, enlarged @ Internet Archive
- Bertrand Russell (1925) A B C of Relativity
- G. D. Birkhoff (1926) Relativity and Modern Physics, Google Books snippets
- Wolfgang Pauli (1926) Relativitätstheorie, Klein's encyclopedia V.19 via Internet Archive
- Bridgman, Percy Williams (1962). A Sophisticate's Primer of Relativity. Middletown, Conn: Wesleyan University Press. OCLC 530615.
- Richard C. Tolman (1934) Relativity, Thermodynamics and Cosmology
- Charles Musès (1953) An Evaluation of Relativity after a Half-century
- Wolfgang Rindler (1969) Essential Relativity: Special, General, and Cosmological, second edition 2001
- Misner, Charles W.; Thorne, Kip S.; Wheeler, John Archibald (1973). Gravitation. 24th printing. New York: W. H. Freeman. ISBN 978-0-7167-0344-0. (1200 pages)
- Paul Dirac (1975) General Theory of Relativity, 69 pages, summarises Einstein's general theory of relativity.
- Robert Wald (1984) General Relativity
- Earman, John (1995). Bangs, crunches, whimpers, and shrieks : singularities and acausalities in relativistic spacetimes. New York: Oxford University Press. ISBN 978-0-19-509591-3. OCLC 65223337.
- Carroll, Sean M. (2003). Spacetime and Geometry: An Introduction to General Relativity. Addison-Wesley. ISBN 978-0-8053-8732-2. Reprinted 2019 by Cambridge University Press, ISBN 978-1-108-48839-6.
