= Coordinate conditions =

Method to choose coordinate systems

In general relativity, the laws of physics can be expressed in a generally covariant form. In other words, the description of the world as given by the laws of physics does not depend on our choice of coordinate systems. However, it is often useful to fix upon a particular coordinate system, in order to solve actual problems or make actual predictions. A coordinate condition selects such coordinate system(s).

== Indeterminacy in general relativity ==
The Einstein field equations do not determine the metric uniquely, even if one knows what the metric tensor equals everywhere at an initial time. This situation is analogous to the failure of the Maxwell equations to determine the potentials uniquely. In both cases, the ambiguity can be removed by gauge fixing. Thus, coordinate conditions are a type of gauge condition. No coordinate condition is generally covariant, but many coordinate conditions are Lorentz covariant or rotationally covariant.

Naively, one might think that coordinate conditions would take the form of equations for the evolution of the four coordinates, and indeed in some cases (e.g. the harmonic coordinate condition) they can be put in that form. However, it is more usual for them to appear as four additional equations (beyond the Einstein field equations) for the evolution of the metric tensor. The Einstein field equations alone do not fully determine the evolution of the metric relative to the coordinate system. It might seem that they would since there are ten equations to determine the ten components of the metric. However, due to the second Bianchi identity of the Riemann curvature tensor, the divergence of the Einstein tensor is zero which means that four of the ten equations are redundant, leaving four degrees of freedom which can be associated with the choice of the four coordinates. The same result can be derived from a Kramers-Moyal-van-Kampen expansion of the Master equation (using the Clebsch–Gordan coefficients for decomposing tensor products).

== Harmonic coordinates ==
A particularly useful coordinate condition is the harmonic condition (also known as the "de Donder gauge"):

$$0 = \Gamma^{\alpha}_{\beta \gamma} g^{\beta \gamma} \!.$$

Here, gamma is a Christoffel symbol (also known as the "affine connection"), and the "g" with superscripts is the inverse of the metric tensor. This harmonic condition is frequently used by physicists when working with gravitational waves. This condition is also frequently used to derive the post-Newtonian approximation.

Although the harmonic coordinate condition is not generally covariant, it is Lorentz covariant. This coordinate condition resolves the ambiguity of the metric tensor $g_{\mu \nu} \!$ by providing four additional differential equations that the metric tensor must satisfy.

== Synchronous coordinates ==
Another particularly useful coordinate condition is the synchronous condition:

$$g_{01} = g_{02} = g_{03} = 0 \!$$

and

$$g_{00} = -1 \!$$.

Synchronous coordinates are also known as Gaussian coordinates. They are frequently used in cosmology.

The synchronous coordinate condition is neither generally covariant nor Lorentz covariant. This coordinate condition resolves the ambiguity of the metric tensor $g_{\mu \nu} \!$ by providing four algebraic equations that the metric tensor must satisfy.

== Other coordinates ==
Many other coordinate conditions have been employed by physicists, though none as pervasively as those described above. Almost all coordinate conditions used by physicists, including the harmonic and synchronous coordinate conditions, would be satisfied by a metric tensor that equals the Minkowski tensor everywhere. (However, since the Riemann and hence the Ricci tensor for Minkowski coordinates is identically zero, the Einstein equations give zero energy/matter for Minkowski coordinates; so Minkowski coordinates cannot be an acceptable final answer.) Unlike the harmonic and synchronous coordinate conditions, some commonly used coordinate conditions may be either under-determinative or over-determinative.

An example of an under-determinative condition is the algebraic statement that the determinant of the metric tensor is −1, which still leaves considerable gauge freedom. This condition would have to be supplemented by other conditions in order to remove the ambiguity in the metric tensor.

An example of an over-determinative condition is the algebraic statement that the difference between the metric tensor and the Minkowski tensor is simply a null four-vector times itself, which is known as a Kerr-Schild form of the metric. This Kerr-Schild condition goes well beyond removing coordinate ambiguity, and thus also prescribes a type of physical space-time structure. The determinant of the metric tensor in a Kerr-Schild metric is negative one, which by itself is an under-determinative coordinate condition.

When choosing coordinate conditions, it is important to beware of illusions or artifacts that can be created by that choice. For example, the Schwarzschild metric may include an apparent singularity at a surface that is separate from the point-source, but that singularity is merely an artifact of the choice of coordinate conditions, rather than arising from actual physical reality.

If one is going to solve the Einstein field equations using approximate methods such as the post-Newtonian expansion, then one should try to choose a coordinate condition which will make the expansion converge as quickly as possible (or at least prevent it from diverging). Similarly, for numerical methods one needs to avoid caustics (coordinate singularities).

== Lorentz covariant coordinate conditions ==
If one combines a coordinate condition which is Lorentz covariant, such as the harmonic coordinate condition mentioned above, with the Einstein field equations, then one gets a theory which is in some sense consistent with both special and general relativity. Among the simplest examples of such coordinate conditions are these:

1. $g_{\alpha \beta , \gamma} \eta^{\beta \gamma} = k \, g_{\mu \nu , \alpha} \eta^{\mu \nu} \,.$
2. $g^{\alpha \beta}{}_{, \beta} = k \, g^{\mu \nu}{}_{, \gamma} \eta_{\mu \nu} \eta^{\alpha \gamma} \,.$

where one can fix the constant k to be any convenient value.
