= Principle of relativity =

Physics principle

In physics, the principle of relativity is the idea that the laws of physics should remain consistent over time and from one place to another. Several principles of relativity have been successfully applied during the development of physics, implicitly in Newtonian mechanics and explicitly in Albert Einstein's special relativity and general relativity.

For example, in the framework of special relativity, the Maxwell equations have the same form in all inertial frames of reference. In the framework of general relativity, the Maxwell equations or the Einstein field equations have the same form in arbitrary frames of reference.

== Basic concepts ==
A principle is an idea that is taken as fundamentally true. In the physical sciences, principles play somewhat the role of axioms in logic and mathematics, or more loosely, as foundations or guides on which to build theories. The Principle of Relativity in physics is the idea that laws should be universal, and the same for all observers. This then becomes a definition of what can be a physical law: anything that different observers see differently is not a physical law, but is incidental to the observer. Whatever remains constant for different observers is a candidate for a physical law. This principle is most useful in dynamics and kinematics, the descriptions of forces and the motion of bodies. The term "relative" in this context refers to the fact that measurements are always relative to an observer, and the "universal" suggests there may be rules relating the measurements of any observer to those of any other.

Theoretical physics attempts to describe observations as models. These are usually systems of equations that predict how the measured data will change from one instant to the next, depending on zero or more free parameters. A simple example of a model is Galileo's law of falling bodies. Measurements made by a single observer are relative to that observer, and use arbitrary coordinate systems selected by the observer.

The form the model takes depends strongly on the observer's coordinate system.

For example, if an observer uses Cartesian coordinates, the path of a falling body has a simple form; but if the observer is contrary and uses, say, time-varying ellipsoidal coordinates, measurements of the same path will be described by a much more complicated expression. Fortunately the mathematical rules for switching between coordinate systems are inherent in their definitions. This applies to all possible coordinates, including those in arbitrary relative motion.

But the idea that laws must look the same to all observers in any coordinate system imposes a symmetry on the laws. According to a mathematical result called Noether's theorem, any continuous symmetry will also imply a corresponding conservation law.

As an example, if a law is the same for observers at different times, energy must be conserved. In this light, relativity principles make testable predictions about how nature behaves.

== History ==
The ideas behind the principle of relativity have been around since Galileo. By the mid nineteenth century, the idea was widespread, especially in the context of electromagnetism, but the term was only formalized in 1904 by Poincaré:

“Il semble que cette impossibilité de démontrer le mouvement absolu soit une loi générale de la nature; je l’appellerai le principe de relativité.”

There have been several main areas of physics where a version of the Principle of Relativity was used, with different assumptions about what is constant. In particular Einstein formulated it for the special case of uniform motion,

Special principle of relativity: If a system of coordinates K is chosen so that, in relation to it, physical laws hold good in their simplest form, the same laws hold good in relation to any other system of coordinates K' moving in uniform translation relatively to K.

— Albert Einstein: The Foundation of the General Theory of Relativity, Part A, §1

This defines an inertial frame of reference.

The special principle of relativity is used in both Newtonian mechanics and the theory of special relativity. Its influence in the latter is so strong that Max Planck named the theory after the principle.

In the general case there is no restriction on the relative motion of the coordinate systems; In classical physics, fictitious forces are used to describe acceleration in non-inertial reference frames. General Relativity eliminates the need for such ad-hoc inventions, although they are still very useful in ordinary circumstances.

=== In Newtonian mechanics ===
The special principle of relativity was first described by Galileo Galilei in 1632 in the First Day of his Dialogue Concerning the Two Chief World Systems, using the metaphor of Galileo's ship. He did not, however, give a name to the concept.

Newton put this metaphor in the Scholium following the definitions in his Principia and used it to develop his laws of motion. Newtonian mechanics added laws of motion, gravitation, and assertions of absolute space and time to the principle. When formulated in the context of these laws, the special principle of relativity states that the laws of mechanics are invariant under a Galilean transformation.

=== In Maxwell's electrodynamics ===
In combination with Maxwell's equations, the principle of relativity leads to special relativity. Maxwell found the speed of light calculated from his equations exactly matched experimental measurements, and introduced the term relativity to physics in the modern sense; but narrowly missed further developments. In the understanding at that time, waves required a medium (the luminiferous aether ) to propagate, and the observer would have absolute motion relative to it, incompatible with the relativity principle as defined by Henri Poincaré.

Hypotheses such as length contraction were contemplated to save the appearances. Joseph Larmor and Hendrik Lorentz discovered that Maxwell's equations were invariant only under a particular change of variables, the Lorentz transformations.

In their 1905 papers on electrodynamics, Henri Poincaré and Albert Einstein explained that with the Lorentz transformations the principle of relativity holds perfectly. Einstein elevated the (special) principle of relativity to a postulate of the theory and combined it with the independence of the speed of light (in vacuum) from the motion of its source. From this he derived the Lorentz transformations. This combination forced a re-examination of the fundamental meanings of space and time intervals, in particular their absolute nature.

The constancy of the speed of light for all observers cannot be decided from the principle of relativity alone, or anything else, but needs to be established by experiment, as do all physical laws.

=== General Relativity and beyond ===
The general principle of relativity eliminates the condition of uniform motion. It states:

All systems of reference are equivalent with respect to the formulation of the fundamental laws of physics.

— C. Møller The Theory of Relativity, p. 220

That is, physical laws are the same in all reference frames—inertial or non-inertial. Einstein found it necessary to add two further axioms in order to build a consistent theory including gravity. These are the Equivalence Principle and locality. Locality means that the laws apply only within a small region of space and time, so that high-order corrections are negligible. The Equivalence Principle (in one form or another) allows spacetime to have a unique geometry, otherwise different particles would each need their own geometry.

Physics in non-inertial reference frames was historically treated by a coordinate transformation, first, to an inertial reference frame, performing the necessary calculations therein, and then returning to the non-inertial reference frame. In most such situations, the same laws of physics can be used if certain fictitious forces are added into the problem; an example is a uniformly rotating reference frame, which can be treated as an inertial reference frame if one adds a fictitious centrifugal force and Coriolis force.

Usage of the principle of relativity does not end with General Relativity. In modern theoretical physics, Lorentz Invariance is widely used to guarantee that the equations of motion are frame-independent. Well-known cases where it is inherent in the formulation of the theory include Quantum Electrodynamics the Standard Model, Quantum Chromodynamics, and Electroweak theory.

Nevertheless, the principle of relativity is not strictly needed in other areas such as thermodynamics, statistical mechanics, and solid state theory. It may be necessary, however, to incorporate it at some level when considering extreme conditions.

== See also ==
- Background independence
- Conjugate diameters
- Cosmic microwave background radiation
- Equivalence principle
- Galilean relativity
- General relativity including Introduction to general relativity
- Invariant
- List of textbooks on relativity
- Newton's laws
- Preferred frame
- Principle of covariance
- Principle of locality
- Principle of uniformity
- Special relativity
