= Biquaternion =

Quaternions with complex number coefficients

In abstract algebra, the biquaternions are the numbers w + x i + y j + z k, where w, x, y, and z are complex numbers, or variants thereof, and the elements of {1, i, j, k} multiply as in the quaternion group and commute with their coefficients. There are three types of biquaternions corresponding to complex numbers and the variations thereof:

- Biquaternions when the coefficients are complex numbers.
- Split-biquaternions when the coefficients are split-complex numbers.
- Dual quaternions when the coefficients are dual numbers.

This article is about the ordinary biquaternions named by William Rowan Hamilton in 1844. Some of the more prominent proponents of these biquaternions include Alexander Macfarlane, Arthur W. Conway, Ludwik Silberstein, and Cornelius Lanczos. As developed below, the unit quasi-sphere of the biquaternions provides a representation of the Lorentz group, which is the foundation of special relativity.

The algebra of biquaternions can be considered as a tensor product C ⊗_{R} H, where C is the field of complex numbers and H is the division algebra of (real) quaternions. In other words, the biquaternions are just the complexification of the quaternions. Viewed as a complex algebra, the biquaternions are isomorphic to the algebra of 2 × 2 complex matrices M_{2}(C). They are also isomorphic to several Clifford algebras including C ⊗_{R} H = Cl^{[0]}_{3}(C) = Cl_{2}(C) = Cl_{1,2}(R), the Pauli algebra Cl_{3,0}(R), and the even part Cl^{[0]}_{1,3}(R) = Cl^{[0]}_{3,1}(R) of the spacetime algebra. In the physics literature, the biquaternions, in its real Clifford algebra definition as Cl_{3,0}(R), are used under the name algebra of physical space.

== Definition ==
Let {1, i, j, k} be the basis for the (real) quaternions H, and let u, v, w, x be complex numbers, then

$$q = u \mathbf 1 + v \mathbf i + w \mathbf j + x \mathbf k$$

is a biquaternion. To distinguish square roots of minus one in the biquaternions, Hamilton and Arthur W. Conway used the convention of representing the square root of minus one in the scalar field C by h to avoid confusion with the i in the quaternion group. Commutativity of the scalar field with the quaternion group is assumed:

$$h \mathbf i = \mathbf i h,\ \ h \mathbf j = \mathbf j h,\ \ h \mathbf k = \mathbf k h .$$

Hamilton introduced the terms bivector, biconjugate, bitensor, and biversor to extend notions used with real quaternions H.

Hamilton's primary exposition on biquaternions came in 1853 in his Lectures on Quaternions. The editions of Elements of Quaternions, in 1866 by William Edwin Hamilton (son of Rowan), and in 1899, 1901 by Charles Jasper Joly, reduced the biquaternion coverage in favour of the real quaternions.

Considered with the operations of component-wise addition, and multiplication according to the quaternion group, this collection forms a 4-dimensional algebra over the complex numbers C. The algebra of biquaternions is associative, but not commutative. A biquaternion is either a unit or a zero divisor. The algebra of biquaternions forms a composition algebra and can be constructed from bicomplex numbers. See § As a composition algebra below.

== Place in ring theory ==
=== Linear representation ===
Note that the matrix product

$$\begin{pmatrix}h & 0\\0 & -h\end{pmatrix}\begin{pmatrix}0 & 1\\-1 & 0\end{pmatrix} = \begin{pmatrix}0 & h\\h & 0\end{pmatrix}$$.

Because h is the imaginary unit, each of these three arrays has a square equal to the negative of the identity matrix. When this matrix product is interpreted as i j = k, then one obtains a subgroup of matrices that is isomorphic to the quaternion group. Consequently,

$$\begin{pmatrix}u+hv & w+hx\\-w+hx & u-hv\end{pmatrix}$$

represents biquaternion q = u 1 + v i + w j + x k. Given any 2 × 2 complex matrix, there are complex values u, v, w, and x to put it in this form so that the matrix ring M(2, C) is isomorphic to the biquaternion ring. This representation also shows that the 16-element group

$$\{\pm\mathbf 1, \pm h, \pm\mathbf i, \pm h\mathbf i, \pm\mathbf j, \pm h\mathbf j, \pm\mathbf k, \pm h\mathbf k \}$$

is isomorphic to the Pauli group, the central product of a cyclic group of order 4 and the dihedral group of order 8. Concretely, the Pauli matrices

$$X =
\begin{pmatrix}
0&1\\
1&0
\end{pmatrix},\quad
Y =
\begin{pmatrix}
0&-h\\
h&0
\end{pmatrix},\quad
Z =
\begin{pmatrix}
1&0\\
0&-1
\end{pmatrix}$$

correspond respectively to the elements －hk, －hj, and －hi.

=== Subalgebras ===
Considering the biquaternion algebra over the scalar field of real numbers R, the set

$$\{\mathbf 1, h, \mathbf i, h\mathbf i, \mathbf j, h\mathbf j, \mathbf k, h\mathbf k \}$$

forms a basis so the algebra has eight real dimensions. The squares of the elements hi, hj, and hk are all positive one, for example, (hi)^{2} = h^{2}i^{2} = (−1)(−1) = +1.

The subalgebra given by

$$\{ x + y(h\mathbf i) : x, y \in \R \}$$

is ring isomorphic to the plane of split-complex numbers, which has an algebraic structure built upon the unit hyperbola. The elements hj and hk also determine such subalgebras.

Furthermore, $\{ x + y \mathbf j : x,y \in \Complex \}$ is a subalgebra isomorphic to the bicomplex numbers.

A third subalgebra called coquaternions is generated by hj and hk. It is seen that (hj)(hk) = (−1)i, and that the square of this element is −1. These elements generate the dihedral group of the square. The linear subspace with basis {1, i, hj, hk} thus is closed under multiplication, and forms the coquaternion algebra.

In the context of quantum mechanics and spinor algebra, the biquaternions hi, hj, and hk (or their negatives), viewed in the M_{2}(C) representation, are called Pauli matrices.

== Algebraic properties ==
The biquaternions have two conjugations:

- the biconjugate or biscalar minus bivector is $q^* = w - x\mathbf i - y\mathbf j - z\mathbf k \!\ ,$ and
- the complex conjugation of biquaternion coefficients $\bar{q} = \bar{w} + \bar{x}\mathbf i + \bar{y} \mathbf j + \bar{z}\mathbf k$

where $\bar{z} = a - bh$ when $z = a + bh,\quad a,b \in \reals,\quad h^2 = -\mathbf 1.$

Note that $(pq)^* = q^* p^*, \quad \overline{pq} = \bar{p} \bar{q}, \quad \overline{q^*} = \bar{q}^*.$

Clearly, if $q q^* = 0$ then q is a zero divisor. Otherwise $\lbrace q q^* \rbrace^{-\mathbf 1}$ is a complex number. Further, $q q^* = q^* q$ is easily verified. This allows the inverse to be defined by

- $q^{-1} = q^* \lbrace q q^* \rbrace^{-1}$, if $qq^* \neq 0.$

=== Relation to Lorentz transformations ===
Consider now the linear subspace

$$M = \lbrace q\colon q^* = \bar{q} \rbrace = \lbrace t + x(h\mathbf i) + y(h \mathbf j) + z(h \mathbf k)\colon t, x, y, z \in \reals \rbrace .$$

M is not a subalgebra since it is not closed under products; for example $(h\mathbf i)(h\mathbf j) = h^2 \mathbf{ij} = -\mathbf k \notin M.$ Indeed, M cannot form an algebra if it is not even a magma.

Proposition: If q is in M, then $q q^* = t^2 - x^2 - y^2 - z^2.$

Proof: From the definitions,

$$\begin{align}
q q^* &= (t+xh\mathbf i+yh\mathbf j+zh\mathbf k)(t-xh\mathbf i-yh\mathbf j-zh\mathbf k)\\
&= t^2 - x^2(h\mathbf i)^2 - y^2(h\mathbf j)^2 - z^2(h\mathbf k)^2 \\
&= t^2 - x^2 - y^2 - z^2.
\end{align}$$

Definition: Let biquaternion g satisfy $g g^* = 1.$ Then the Lorentz transformation associated with g is given by

$$T(q) = g^* q \bar{g}.$$

Proposition: If q is in M, then T(q) is also in M.

Proof: $(g^* q \bar{g})^* = \bar{g}^* q^* g = \overline{g^*} \bar{q} g = \overline{g^* q \bar{g})}.$

Proposition: $\quad T(q) (T(q))^* = q q^*$

Proof: Note first that gg* = 1 implies that the sum of the squares of its four complex components is one. Then the sum of the squares of the complex conjugates of these components is also one. Therefore, $\bar{g} (\bar{g})^* = 1.$ Now

$$(g^* q \bar{g})(g^* q \bar{g})^* = g^* q (\bar{g} \bar{g}^*) q^* g = g^* q q^* g = q q^*.$$

== Associated terminology ==
As the biquaternions have been a fixture of linear algebra since the beginnings of mathematical physics, there is an array of concepts that are illustrated or represented by biquaternion algebra. The transformation group $G = \lbrace g : g g^* = 1 \rbrace$ has two parts, $G \cap H$ and $G \cap M.$ The first part is characterized by $g = \bar{g}$ ; then the Lorentz transformation corresponding to g is given by $T(q) = g^{-1} q g$ since $g^* = g^{-1}.$ Such a transformation is a rotation by quaternion multiplication, and the collection of them is SO(3) $\cong G \cap H .$ But this subgroup of G is not a normal subgroup, so no quotient group can be formed.

To view $G \cap M$ it is necessary to show some subalgebra structure in the biquaternions. Let r represent an element of the sphere of square roots of minus one in the real quaternion subalgebra H. Then (hr)^{2} = +1 and the plane of biquaternions given by $D_r = \lbrace z = x + yhr : x, y \in \mathbb R \rbrace$ is a commutative subalgebra isomorphic to the plane of split-complex numbers. Just as the ordinary complex plane has a unit circle, $D_r$ has a unit hyperbola given by

$$\exp(ahr) = \cosh(a) + hr\ \sinh(a),\quad a \in R.$$

Just as the unit circle turns by multiplication through one of its elements, so the hyperbola turns because $\exp(ahr) \exp(bhr) = \exp((a+b)hr).$ Hence these algebraic operators on the hyperbola are called hyperbolic versors. The unit circle in C and unit hyperbola in D_{r} are examples of one-parameter groups. For every square root r of minus one in H, there is a one-parameter group in the biquaternions given by $G \cap D_r.$

The space of biquaternions has a natural topology through the Euclidean metric on 8-space. With respect to this topology, G is a topological group. Moreover, it has analytic structure making it a six-parameter Lie group. Consider the subspace of bivectors $A = \lbrace q : q^* = -q \rbrace$. Then the exponential map $\exp:A \to G$ takes the real vectors to $G \cap H$ and the h-vectors to $G \cap M.$ When equipped with the commutator, A forms the Lie algebra of G. Thus this study of a six-dimensional space serves to introduce the general concepts of Lie theory. When viewed in the matrix representation, G is called the special linear group SL(2,C) in M(2, C).

Many of the concepts of special relativity are illustrated through the biquaternion structures laid out. The subspace M corresponds to Minkowski space, with the four coordinates giving the time and space locations of events in a resting frame of reference. Any hyperbolic versor exp(ahr) corresponds to a velocity in direction r of speed c tanh a where c is the velocity of light. The inertial frame of reference of this velocity can be made the resting frame by applying the Lorentz boost T given by g = exp(0.5ahr) since then $g^{\star} = \exp(-0.5ahr) = g^*$ so that $T(\exp(ahr)) = 1 .$ Naturally the hyperboloid $G \cap M,$ which represents the range of velocities for sub-luminal motion, is of physical interest. There has been considerable work associating this "velocity space" with the hyperboloid model of hyperbolic geometry. In special relativity, the hyperbolic angle parameter of a hyperbolic versor is called rapidity. Thus we see the biquaternion group G provides a group representation for the Lorentz group.

After the introduction of spinor theory, particularly in the hands of Wolfgang Pauli and Élie Cartan, the biquaternion representation of the Lorentz group was superseded. The new methods were founded on basis vectors in the set

$$\{ q \ :\  q q^* = 0 \} = \left\{ w + x\mathbf i + y\mathbf j + z\mathbf k \ :\ w^2 + x^2 + y^2 + z^2 = 0 \right\}$$

which is called the complex light cone. The above representation of the Lorentz group coincides with what physicists refer to as four-vectors. Beyond four-vectors, the Standard Model of particle physics also includes other Lorentz representations, known as scalars, and the (1, 0) ⊕ (0, 1)-representation associated with e.g. the electromagnetic field tensor. Furthermore, particle physics makes use of the SL(2, C) representations (or projective representations of the Lorentz group) known as left- and right-handed Weyl spinors, Majorana spinors, and Dirac spinors. It is known that each of these seven representations can be constructed as invariant subspaces within the biquaternions.

== As a composition algebra ==
Although W. R. Hamilton introduced biquaternions in the 19th century, its delineation of its mathematical structure as a special type of algebra over a field was accomplished in the 20th century: the biquaternions may be generated out of the bicomplex numbers in the same way that Adrian Albert generated the real quaternions out of complex numbers in the so-called Cayley–Dickson construction. In this construction, a bicomplex number (w, z) has conjugate (w, z)* = (w, – z).

The biquaternion is then a pair of bicomplex numbers (a, b), where the product with a second biquaternion (c, d) is

$$(a,b)(c,d) = (a c - d^* b, d a + b c^* ).$$

If $a = (u, v), b = (w,z),$ then the biconjugate $(a, b)^* = (a^*, -b).$

When (a, b)* is written as a 4-vector of ordinary complex numbers,

$$(u, v, w, z)^* = (u, -v, -w, -z).$$

The biquaternions form an example of a quaternion algebra, and it has norm

$$N(u,v,w,z) = u^2 + v^2 + w^2 + z^2 .$$

Two biquaternions p and q satisfy N(pq) = N(p) N(q), indicating that N is a quadratic form admitting composition, so that the biquaternions form a composition algebra.

== Scalar-vector representation ==
An arbitrary biquaternion $A$ can be represented as a sum of a complex number (scalar) $\alpha = Sc(A)$ and a three-dimensional complex-valued vector $\mathbf a = Vc(A)$:

$$A = \alpha + \mathbf a = (\alpha,\mathbf a)$$

There are two types of scalar-vector representation, based on different forms of biquaternionic product. Both representations are equivalent. In standard representation the product of two biquaternions $A = (\alpha,\mathbf a)$ and $B = (\beta,\mathbf b)$ has the form:

$$A B = (\alpha \beta - (\mathbf a \mathbf b),\alpha \mathbf b + \beta \mathbf a + [\mathbf a \mathbf b])$$,

where $(\mathbf a \mathbf b)$ and $[\mathbf a \mathbf b]$ are scalar product and vector product of $\mathbf a$ and $\mathbf b$, respectively. In complex representation the product of the same biquaternions has the form:

$$A B = (\alpha \beta + (\mathbf a \mathbf b),\alpha \mathbf b + \beta \mathbf a + i [\mathbf a \mathbf b])$$

Note that in complex representation the product of two real-valued biquaternions yields a complex-valued biquaternion unless their vector parts are collinear. Biquaternionic conjugate of a given biquaternion $A=(\alpha,\mathbf a)$ is defined as:

$$\overline A = (\alpha, - \mathbf a)$$

Square modulus of a biquaternion $A=(\alpha,\mathbf a)$ is a complex number

$$|A|^2 = A \overline A = \overline A A = \alpha^2 - \mathbf a^2$$

The latter has the multiplicative property:

$$|A B|^2 = |A|^2 |B|^2$$

Applying biquaternonic or complex conjugation to the product of biquaternions turns each multiplier to its conjugate and change their order:

$$\overline { A B } = \overline B \overline A$$
$$( A B )^* = B^* A^*$$

Depending on their square modulus, all biquaternions are divided into two non-intersecting subspaces (by multiplication): nullquaternions and finite biquaternions. Nullquaternions are biquaternions with zero square modulus; finite biquaternions are biquaternions with non-zero square modulus.

== See also ==
- Biquaternion algebra
- Hypercomplex number
- Hypercomplex analysis
- Joachim Lambek
- MacFarlane's use
- Quotient ring
- Quaternion Lorentz Transformations
- Biquaternion functions
