= Ludwik Silberstein =

Polish-American physicist (1872–1948)

Ludwik Silberstein (May 17, 1872 – January 17, 1948) was a Polish-American physicist who helped make special relativity and general relativity staples of university coursework. His textbook The Theory of Relativity was published by Macmillan in 1914 with a second edition, expanded to include general relativity, in 1924.

== Life ==
Silberstein was born on May 17, 1872, in Warsaw to Samuel Silberstein and Emily Steinkalk. He was educated in Kraków, Heidelberg, and Berlin. To teach he went to Bologna, Italy from 1899 to 1904. Then he took a position at Sapienza University of Rome.

In 1907 Silberstein described a bivector approach to the fundamental electromagnetic equations. When $\mathbf{E}$ and $\mathbf{B}$ represent electric and magnetic vector fields with values in $\mathbb{R}^3$, then Silberstein suggested $\mathbf{E} + i \mathbf{B}$ would have values in $\mathbb{C}^3$, consolidating the field description with complexification. This contribution has been described as a crucial step in modernizing Maxwell's equations, while $\mathbf{E} + i \mathbf{B}$ is known as the Riemann–Silberstein vector.

Silberstein taught in Rome until 1920, when he entered private research for the Eastman Kodak Company of Rochester, New York. For nine years he maintained this consultancy with Kodak labs while he gave his relativity course on occasion at the University of Chicago, the University of Toronto, and Cornell University. He lived until January 17, 1948.

== Textbook inaugurating relativity science ==
At the International Congress of Mathematicians (ICM) in 1912 at Cambridge, Silberstein spoke on "Some applications of quaternions". Though the text was not published in the proceedings of the Congress, it did appear in the Philosophical Magazine of May, 1912, with the title "Quaternionic form of relativity". The following year Macmillan published The Theory of Relativity. Its 1924 edition is available on-line in the Internet Archive (see Works). The quaternions used are actually biquaternions. The book is highly readable and well-referenced with contemporary sources in the footnotes.

Several reviews were published. Nature expressed some misgivings:

A systematic exposition of the principle of relativity necessarily consists very largely in the demonstration of invariant properties of certain mathematical relations. Hence it is bound to appear a little uninteresting to the experimentalist...little is done to remove the unfortunate impression that relativity is a fad of the mathematician, and not a thing for the every-day physicist.

In his review Morris R. Cohen wrote, "Dr. Silberstein is not inclined to emphasize the revolutionary character of the new ideas, but rather concerned to show their intimate connection with older ones." Another review by Maurice Solovine states that Silberstein subjected the relativity principle to an exhaustive examination in the context of, and with respect to, the principal problems of mathematical physics taken up at the time.

On the basis of the book, Silberstein was invited to lecture at the University of Toronto. The influence of these lectures on John Lighton Synge has been noted:

Synge had also been strongly influenced a few months previously [in January 1921] by a Toronto lecture series organized by J.C. McLennan on "Recent Advances in Physics", at which Silberstein gave eighteen lectures on "Special and Generalized Theories of Relativity and Gravitation, and on Spectroscopy", all from a mathematical standpoint.

Silberstein gave a plenary address at the International Congress of Mathematicians in 1924 in Toronto: A finite world-radius and some of its cosmological implications.

== Einstein–Silberstein debate ==
In 1935, following a controversial debate with Albert Einstein, Silberstein published a solution of Einstein's field equations that appeared to describe a static, axisymmetric metric with only two point singularities representing two point masses. Such a solution clearly violates our understanding of gravity: with nothing to support them and no kinetic energy to hold them apart, the two masses should fall towards each other due to their mutual gravity, in contrast with the static nature of Silberstein's solution. This led Silberstein to claim that A. Einstein's theory was flawed, in need of a revision. In response, Einstein and Nathan Rosen published a Letter to the Editor in which they pointed out a critical flaw in Silberstein's reasoning. Unconvinced, Silberstein took the debate to the popular press, with The Evening Telegram in Toronto publishing an article titled "Fatal blow to relativity issued here" on March 7, 1936. Nonetheless, Einstein was correct and Silberstein was wrong: as of 2003, all solutions to Weyl's family of axisymmetric metrics, of which Silberstein's is one example, necessarily contain singular structures ("struts", "ropes", or "membranes") that are responsible for holding masses against the attractive force of gravity in a static configuration.

== Other contributions ==
According to Martin Claussen, Ludwik Silberstein initiated a line of thought involving eddy currents in the atmosphere, or fluids generally. He says that Silberstein anticipated foundational work by Vilhelm Bjerknes (1862–1951).

== Works ==
- 1907: Electromagnetische Grundgleichungen in bivectorielle Behandlung, Ann. Physik 22 579–86 & 24:783–4
- 1912: Quaternionic form of relativity, Phil. Mag. 14 1912 790–809
- 1913: Second memoir on quaternionic relativity, Phil. Mag. 15 1913 135-144
- 1913: Vectorial Mechanics, 2nd edition 1926, Macmillan & Company.
- 1914: The Theory of Relativity, Macmillan, 2nd edition 1924.
- 1918: Elements of the Electromagnetic Theory of Light, Longmans, Green & Co.
- 1918: Simplified Method of Tracing Rays Through any Optical System of Lenses, Prisms, and Mirrors, Longmans, Green & Co.
- 1919: Elements of Vector Algebra, Longmans, Green and Company.
- 1920: Report on the Quantum Theory of Spectra, Adam Hilger.
- 1922: Quantum Theory of Photographic Exposure Philosophical Magazine 6th series, volume 44:257–73 and 44:956–68.
- 1924: The Theory of General Relativity and Gravitation, D. Van Nostrand,
- 1930: The Size of the Universe, Oxford University Press
- 1933: Causality: A Law of Nature or a Maxim of the Naturalist, Macmillan
