= Biquaternion Lorentz transformation =

Linear transformation of spacetime coordinates

In special relativity, a biquaternion Lorentz transformation is formulation of the Lorentz transformation using biquaternions.

== Lorentz transformation ==
In special relativity, a Lorentz transformation is a real linear transformation of the spacetime cartesian coordinates $t$, $x$, $y$, $z$ that preserves the space time interval squared of Minkowski space-time.

$$c^2 \, t^2-x^2-y^2-z^2$$

Here, $c$ is the speed of light. Using the 4 × 4 matrix $\eta$ of the metric tensor, this is

$$X^\text{T} \eta \, X=\begin{bmatrix}
c \, t      & x & y & z \end{bmatrix}\; \begin{bmatrix}
1 & 0 & 0 & 0  \\
0 & -1 & 0 & 0  \\
0 & 0 & -1 & 0  \\
0 & 0 & 0 & -1  \\
\end{bmatrix} \; \begin{bmatrix}
c \, t \\
x\\
y\\
z\\
\end{bmatrix}$$

Here $X^\text{T}$ is the matrix transpose of $X$.

Any such transformation is a Lorentz transformation. Such transformations can be realized using different formalisms. We mention two other formalisms first before continuing with the treatment of biquaternion Lorentz transformations.

One formalism or way to implement Lorentz transformations is to let $X'=A\,X$, where $A$ is a 4 × 4 real matrix that makes

$$c^2 \, t'^2-x'^2-y'^2-z'^2 = c^2 \, t^2-x^2-y^2-z^2$$

Here t is time and x,y,z are the Cartesian spatial coordinates. This is so if $A^\text{T} \eta \, A = \eta$.

Another formalism or way to do Lorentz transformations is to let the spacetime coordinates be represented by a 2 × 2 hermitian matrix

$$X=\begin{bmatrix}
c\,t+z & x-i\,y \\
x+i\,y & c\,t-z
\end{bmatrix}$$

Here $i$ is the square root of $-1$. The determinant of $X$ is the spacetime interval squared. Let A now be a 2 × 2 complex matrix with determinant 1 and let $A^\dagger$ be the hermitian conjugate of A (the complex conjugate of the transpose of A). Then $X' = A^\dagger X \, A$ has the same determinant as $X$ since the determinant of a product is the product of the determinants and since the determinant of $A^\dagger$ is the complex conjugate of the determinant of $A$, so is also 1. Thus $X$ and $X'$ have the same spacetime interval squared. Also, $X'$ is hermitian since the hermitian conjugate of a product is the product of the hermitian conjugates in reverse order and since $(A^\dagger)^\dagger=A$ and since $X^\dagger=X$. So this is a Lorentz transformation.

This article treats biquaternion Lorentz transformations without reflections, such as time reversal T or spatial inversion P. One author, in Other Lorentz transformations (§3.2.3), does treat biquaternion Lorentz transformations with reflections. Biquaternions are sometimes called the complex quaternions or the complexified quaternions or even just the quaternions in the literature. The biquaternions differ from the quaternions only in that the coefficients of the bases $\{ 1, \mathbf I, \mathbf J, \mathbf K \}$ can be complex numbers rather than real numbers. So real quaternions and biquaternions as we define them differ only in the algebraic field

As will be discussed, the biquaternions representing these Lorentz transformations are those of norm +1 and can be represented non-uniquely by the subgroup of 2 × 2 complex matrices having determinant +1. Representations exist for the biquaternion basis $\{ 1, \mathbf I, \mathbf J, \mathbf K \}$ in terms of 2 × 2 complex matrices which have the same multiplication table. The 2 × 2 identity matrix always represents 1. As will also be discussed, for any given representation, there is a one-to-one correspondence between all 2 × 2 complex matrices and all biquaternions and a one-to-one correspondence between the biquaternions of norm +1, which are those representing Lorentz transformations, and the 2 × 2 complex matrices of determinant +1. A one-to-one correspondence preserving all the algebraic properties is an isomorphism. One particular isomorphism that will be discussed in detail is $1\rightarrow I_{2\times 2}, \; \mathbf I \rightarrow -i\,\sigma_x, \;\mathbf J \rightarrow -i\,\sigma_y, \; \mathbf K \rightarrow -i\,\sigma_z$, where $I_{2\times 2}$ is the 2 × 2 identity matrix, $i$ is the square root of $-1$, and $\sigma_x, \, \sigma_y,\, \sigma_z$ are the Pauli matrices.

== Quaternions ==
The biquaternions have the form

$$\textbf Q = a+b\,\textbf I+c\,\textbf J+d\,\textbf K$$

for complex $a$, $b$, $c$, and $d$. Here $a$ is the scalar part and $b \, \mathbf I + c \, \mathbf J + d \, \mathbf K$ is the vector part. They are a unital non-commutative associative algebra with distributive multiplication. Scalars commute with the basis elements $\{1 \text{,}\,\mathbf I \text{,} \, \mathbf J\text{,} \mathbf K\}$. The basis elements $\textbf{I}$, $\textbf{J}$, and $\textbf{K}$ satisfy
$$\textbf I \; \textbf I = \textbf J \; \textbf J = \textbf K \; \textbf K = \textbf I \; \textbf J \; \textbf K = -1$$

From these, using associativity, it follows that we have the further set of relations:

$$\textbf I \; \textbf J = - \textbf J \; \textbf I = \textbf K \quad\; \textbf J \; \textbf K = - \textbf K \; \textbf J = \textbf I \quad\; \textbf K \; \textbf I = - \textbf I \; \textbf K = \textbf J \quad$$

Two of these relations are proved as follows:

$$\mathbf I \, = \, \mathbf I (-\mathbf I \, \mathbf J \, \mathbf K) \, = \, (-\mathbf I \, \mathbf I) \, (\mathbf J \, \mathbf K) \, = \, \mathbf J \, \mathbf K$$

and

$$\mathbf K \, \mathbf J \, =\, (-\mathbf I \, \mathbf J \, \mathbf K)\, (\mathbf K \, \mathbf J \,)\, = \, (-\mathbf I) \, (\mathbf J \, (\mathbf K \, \mathbf K) \, \mathbf J) \, = \, -\mathbf I$$

proving

$$\mathbf J \, \mathbf K \, =-\mathbf K \, \mathbf J \, = \, \mathbf I$$

The other relations are proved similarly. Note that these relations are the same if $\mathbf I \text{,} \, \mathbf J \text{, and } \mathbf K$ are cyclically permuted. Cyclic permutation is shown by observing for instance that

$$\mathbf I  \, \mathbf J \, \mathbf K \, = \, (\mathbf I)  \, (\mathbf J \, \mathbf K) \, = \, (\mathbf J \, \mathbf K) \, (\mathbf I) \, = \, \mathbf J \, \mathbf K \, \mathbf I$$

The real quaternions can be used to do spatial rotations, but not to do Lorentz transformations with boosts, which are transformations from one inertial reference frame to another in uniform relative motion. But if $a$, $b$, $c$, and $d$ are allowed to be complex, they can.

== Historical perspective ==
The quaternions were discovered in 1843 by William Rowan Hamilton. He had long sought a three-dimensional generalization of the complex numbers, which could represent rotations in three-dimensional space as complex numbers can do in the complex plane. The difficulty lay in that such a generalization is possible only in four dimensions. For many years, the quaternions were widely used in many fields but were later replaced at the end of the nineteenth century by the vector calculus developed by Gibbs and Heaviside. Both the dot product and the vector cross product have their origins in quaternions by separating the scalar and vector parts of the product of two vector quaternions. Vector quaternions and vector biquaternions have zero scalar parts. The scalar part of such a product is the negative of the dot product and the vector part of such a product is the vector cross product. The quaternions, originally over the real numbers, were extended to be over the complex numbers by Hamilton himself, calling them biquaternions. In special relativity they can represent Lorentz boosts as well as spatial rotations.

Voight (Chapter 1) documents how quaternions led to advances in algebra, geometry, number theory, and other fields. He notes in the chapter 1 conclusion that "...quaternions yield elegant expressions for Lorentz transformations, the basis of the modern theory of relativity" and notes that quaternions are used in computer graphics and attitude control. And Girard notes that "From the very beginning of special relativity, complex quaternions have been used to formulate that theory", referencing L. Silberstein's 1914 book, in which several ways of doing Lorentz transformations are discussed.

General relativity requires other tools, such as the tensor calculus or differential forms. Lorentz transformations in special relativity are cartesian coordinate transformations between inertial reference frames that preserve the squared spacetime interval. More general coordinates and coordinate transformations are used in general relativity. This is because spacetime is curved in accordance with Einstein's field equations which are determined by the distribution of mass-energy so that coordinates can only locally be chosen to make the metric tensor be near $g_{\mu\nu}=\text{diag}(-1,1,1,1)$. Different coordinate systems are useful. For instance, for the Schwarzschild geometry there are the standard Schwarzschild coordinates, isotropic coordinates, the Eddington-Finkelstein coordinates, and the Kruskal-Szekeres coordinates.

Einstein's field equations in general relativity can be obtained in many different ways, such as by using the tensor calculus, by using the calculus of variations with a Lagrangian, or by using differential forms, which can be used to derive the Riemann bivector-valued 2-forms (aka tensor) and which can also treat moving frames. General relativity can also be presented using the Clifford algebra $\mathbb{H} \otimes \mathbb{H}$ over $\mathbb{R}$, where $\mathbb{H}$ is the quaternions, $\mathbb{R}$ is the reals, and $\mathbb{H} \otimes \mathbb{H}$ is a tensor product. That approach is closest to what is presented here. Clifford algebras can represent many mathematical systems in physics. For instance, the complex numbers are a Clifford algebra with one generator $\mathbf e_0=i$ with $\mathbf e_0^2=-1$ and the real quaternions are a Clifford algebra with two generators $\mathbf e_0=\mathbf J \text{, } \mathbf e_1=\mathbf K$, so that $\mathbf e_0^2=-1 \text{, } \mathbf e_1^2=-1\text{, }\mathbf e_0\mathbf e_1=-\mathbf e_1 \mathbf e_0$. The basis element $\mathbf I$ is generated from the two generators as $\mathbf I = \mathbf e_0 \mathbf e_1$

== Minkowski biquaternions ==
We use a biquaternion representing $t$, $x$, $y$, $z$ that was used by P. A. M. Dirac, which has the form:

$$\textbf X = c\,t + i\,x \, \textbf I + i \, y \, \textbf J \, + i\, z \, \textbf K$$

Here, $i$ is the square root of −1 and the speed of light $c = 1$ henceforth. We will call this the Minkowski biquaternion. Girard refers to these as minkowskian quaternions or minquats.

The reason for this definition is that its norm is the spacetime interval squared $t^2-x^2-y^2-z^2$. The norm is defined as

$$\mathbf N(a + b\,\mathbf I + c\,\mathbf J + d\,\mathbf K) = a^2+b^2+c^2+d^2$$

and has the important property that the norm of a product is the product of the norms, making the biquaternions a composition algebra. A real non-zero quaternion always has real positive norm, but a non-zero complex quaternion can have a norm with any complex value, including zero.

A biquaternion $\textbf Q = a + b \, \textbf I + c \, \textbf J \, + d \, \textbf K$ with complex $a$, $b$, $c$, $d$ has two kinds of conjugates:

- The biconjugate is

$$Q^* = a - b\mathbf I - b\mathbf J - d\mathbf K$$

- The complex conjugate is

$$\bar{Q} = \bar{a} + \bar{b}\mathbf I + \bar{c} \mathbf J + \bar{d}\mathbf K$$

The overbar $\bar {}$ denotes complex conjugation. The biconjugate of a product is the product of the biconjugates in reverse order. Note that a biquaternion and its biconjugate have the same norm, so that $N(\mathbf Q^*)=N(\mathbf Q)$ and that the norm of the complex conjugate of a biquaternion is the complex conjugate of its norm, so that $N(\overline \mathbf Q ) = \overline{N(\mathbf Q)}$. The operations denoted by the asterisk superscript and by the overbar are defined as in the article Biquaternion.

For a Minkowski biquaternion

$$\overline \mathbf X^*=\mathbf X$$

As can be seen from the definition, this is a necessary and sufficient condition for a biquaternion $\mathbf X$ to be a Minkowski biquaternion.

Also needed is the identity

$$\mathbf X\,\mathbf X^*=\mathbf X\,\overline \mathbf X=t^2-x^2-y^2-z^2$$

== Biquaternion Lorentz transformation forms ==
=== General form ===
Let $\mathbf Q$ be a biquaternion of norm one and let $\mathbf X$ be a Minkowski biquaternion. Then

$$\mathbf X' = \overline \mathbf Q^*\, \textbf X \, \textbf Q = {\overline {(\overline \mathbf Q^*\, \textbf X \, \textbf Q})}^*$$

By replacing $\mathbf Q$ by $\overline \mathbf Q^*$, this could equally well be written as

$$\mathbf X' =  \mathbf Q \, \textbf X \, \overline \textbf Q^* = {\overline {(\mathbf Q\, \textbf X \, \overline \textbf Q^*})}^*$$

Because of the second equalities in these two equivalent equations, $\mathbf X'$ is a Minkowski biquaternion. And if $\mathbf Q$ has norm 1, then the norm of $\mathbf X'$ equals the norm of $\mathbf X$. This is so since $N(\mathbf X') \, = \, |N(\mathbf Q)|^2 \, N(X)$. This is then a linear transformation of one Minkowski biquaternion into another Minkowski biquaternion having the same spacetime interval squared. Therefore it is a Lorentz transformation. As previously mentioned, there are other Lorentz transformations which are not orthochronous proper Lorentz transformations. As discussed in Girard (§3.2.3), these are

$$\begin {align} \mathbf X' &=  - \, \mathbf Q \, \textbf X \, \overline \textbf Q^* \\
\mathbf X' &= + \, \mathbf Q \, \textbf X^* \, \overline \textbf Q^* \\
\mathbf X' &= - \, \mathbf Q \, \textbf X^* \, \overline \textbf Q^* \end {align}$$

Girard uses different notation, such as a subscript $_c$ for the biconjugate and a superscript asterisk $^*$ for the complex conjugate. In these variants, $\mathbf X'$ is a Minkowski biquaternion if $\mathbf X$ is and $N(\mathbf X')=N(\mathbf X)$ so that the space-time interval squared is unchanged. If $\mathbf Q=1$, then these variants represent a combined P and T, P, and T, respectively, where P is parity or reversal of $x, y, z$ and T is time reversal.

=== Biquaternion spatial rotation and Lorentz boost forms ===
Let $\mathbf n$ be the real direction biquaternion
$$\mathbf n=n_1\,\mathbf I+n_2\,\mathbf J+n_3\,\mathbf K \; \text{ such that } \, n_1^2+n_3^2+n_3^2=1$$

Spatial rotations are represented by

$$\mathbf R=\exp (-\tfrac{\theta}{2} \, \mathbf n ) = \cos (\tfrac{\theta}{2}) - \mathbf n \,\sin (\tfrac{\theta}{2})$$

$\mathbf R$ has norm 1 and so represents a Lorentz transformation. It does not change the scalar part and so must be a rotation.

A rotation by an angle of $\theta$ about the z axis is given by:

$$\begin{align} &\exp(\tfrac{\theta}{2}\,\mathbf K)\, (t+\,i\,x\,\mathbf I\,+\,i\,y\,\, \mathbf J \,+\,i \, z\,\, \mathbf K) \, \exp(-\tfrac{\theta}
{2}\,\mathbf K)\,\\
&=\, t+\,i\,(x\,\cos \theta \, - \, y \,\sin \theta) \,\mathbf I\,+ \,i \, (x \, \sin \theta  \, +\, y \, \cos \theta )\, \mathbf J \,+\, i \, z\,\, \mathbf K \end{align}$$

Thiis is the coordinate transformation

$$\begin{align}t'&=t \\
x'&=x\, \cos (\theta) - y \, \sin(\theta) \\
y'&=x\, \sin (\theta) + y \, \cos(\theta) \\
z'&=z \\
\end{align}$$

Boosts are represented by

$$\mathbf B=\exp (-i\,\tfrac{\alpha}{2}\, \mathbf n ) = \cosh (\tfrac{\alpha}{2})-i \, \mathbf n \, \sinh (\tfrac{\alpha}{2})$$

$\mathbf B$ also has norm 1 and so also represents a Lorentz transformation. It does not change the vector part normal to $\mathbf n$ and so must be a Lorentz boost. Also, in addition to having norm one, a Lorentz boost is a Minkowski biquaternion since it is not changed by $i\rightarrow -i\text{,}\,I\rightarrow -I\text{,}\,J\rightarrow -J\text{,} K\rightarrow -K$, which gives the complex conjugate of the biconjugate. The biconjugate of $\mathbf n$ is $-\mathbf n$.

A boost in the x direction is given by:

$$\begin{align} &\exp(-i\,\tfrac{\alpha}{2}\,\mathbf I)\, (t+\,i\,x\,\mathbf I\,+\,i\,y\,\, \mathbf J \,+\,i \, z\,\, \mathbf K) \, \exp(-i\,\tfrac{\alpha}{2}\,\mathbf I)\,\\
&=\, (t\,\cosh \alpha \, - \, x \,\sinh \alpha)\,+\,i\,(x\,\cosh \alpha \, - \, t \,\sinh \alpha) \,\mathbf I \, + \, i \, y \, \mathbf J \,+\, i \, z \, \mathbf K \end{align}$$

This represents the coordinate transformation:

$$\begin{align} t'&=\cosh(\alpha)\,t-\sinh (\alpha)\,x \\
x'&=\cosh(\alpha)\,x-\sinh (\alpha)\,t \\
y'&=y \\
z'&=z
\end{align}$$

Expressing the exponentials as circular or hyperbolic trigonometric functions is basically De Moivre's formula.

As discussed by Girard, any proper orthochronous Lorentz transformation (no time or space inversion) may be written as the product of a pure Lorentz boost and a pure spatial rotation in either order. For instance, given a biquaternion Lorentz transformation $\textbf Q$, it may be written as the product $\mathbf Q \, = \, \mathbf B \mathbf R$, where $\mathbf B$ is a Lorentz boost and $\mathbf R$ is a rotation by observing that $\mathbf Q \, \bar \mathbf Q^* \,= \, \mathbf B \, \mathbf R \bar \mathbf R^* \,\bar\mathbf B^* \, = \, \mathbf B \,(\mathbf R \,\mathbf R^{-1}) \,\mathbf B\,=\mathbf B^2$. Note that since $\mathbf Q \, \bar \mathbf Q^* \, = \, \overline{(\mathbf Q \, \bar \mathbf Q^*)}^*$, that $\mathbf B^2$ is a Minkowski biquaternion and since the norms of $\mathbf Q$ and $\bar \mathbf Q^*$ are both one and since the norm of a product is the product of the norms, then $\mathbf Q \, \bar \mathbf Q^*$ has norm one. Thus $\mathbf B^2$ has the required properties for a pure Lorentz boost since it is a Minkowski biquaternion of norm one. The square root of $\mathbf B^2$ can be computed as discussed in Girard. Alternatively, since $\mathbf B^2\,=\,\cosh(\alpha)\,-\,i\,\mathbf n \,\sinh(\alpha)$, then $\alpha$ may be determined from the scalar part and $\mathbf n$ then determined from the vector part. This gives $\mathbf B\,=\,\cosh(\frac{\alpha}{2})\,-\,i\,\mathbf n \,\sinh(\frac{\alpha}{2})$. Then $\mathbf R\,=\,\mathbf B^{-1} \, \mathbf Q$.

This decomposition shows, for instance, that although the product of two Lorentz boosts in different directions is not a pure Lorentz boost, it can be expressed as a rotation followed by a pure boost. If $\mathbf Q$ is the product of two Lorentz boosts, say $\mathbf B_2 \, \mathbf B_1$, then this $\mathbf R$ is a product of three Lorentz boosts, namely $\mathbf B_3 \,\mathbf B_2 \, \mathbf B_1$ where $\mathbf B_3=\mathbf B^{-1}$ and $\mathbf B$ is from the $\mathbf B \, \mathbf R$ decomposition of $\mathbf B_2 \, \mathbf B_1$.

It is generally true that a rotation can be expressed as a product of Lorentz boosts. For instance, if $\mathbf B_1$ is a Lorentz boost in the +X direction and $\mathbf B_2$ is a Lorentz boost of the same magnitude but in the +Y direction, then $\mathbf R$ in the $\mathbf B \, \mathbf R$ decomposition is a rotation about the Z axis. Switching the order of the two boosts results in $\mathbf R$ being a rotation about the Z axis with the same magnitude but in the opposite sense. Increasing the magnitude of the two Lorentz boosts increases the magnitude of the rotation. Any rotation of a magnitude less than 90° may be achieved this way, but by repeatedly applying the three Lorentz boosts giving $\mathbf R$, greater rotations may be achieved. Also, by doing successive Lorentz boosts $\mathbf B_1 \text{,} \, \mathbf B_2 \text{,} \, \mathbf B_3$ in the +X +Y -X or the -X +Y +X directions, respectively, and then letting $\mathbf B_4=\mathbf B^{-1}$ where $\mathbf B$ is from the $\mathbf B \, \mathbf R$ decomposition of $\mathbf B_3 \mathbf B_2 \mathbf B_1$ then $\mathbf B_4 \mathbf B_3 \mathbf B_2 \mathbf B_1$ is the rotation $\mathbf R$ about the Z axis whose angle can be made anything of magnitude less than 180° by choosing the common magnitude of the Lorentz boosts $\mathbf B_1 \text{,} \, \mathbf B_2 \text{,} \, \mathbf B_3$.

=== 2 × 2 matrices ===
By a simple identification, we show that Lorentz transformations using biquaternions are equivalent to Lorentz transformations using 2 × 2 matrices. The biquaternions have the advantages of being more transparent and simpler to work with.

The biquaternion basis elements $1, \,\mathbf I, \, \mathbf J,\, \mathbf K$ can be represented as the 2 × 2 matrices $1_{2x2}, \, -i \, \sigma_x, \, -i \, \sigma_y, \, -i \, \sigma_z$, respectively. Here the $\sigma_i$ are the 2 × 2 Pauli spin matrices and $1_{2x2}$ is the 2x2 identity matrix. These have the same multiplication table. This representation is not unique. For instance, without changing the multiplication table, the sign of any two can be reversed, or the $\sigma_i$ can be cyclically permuted, or a similarity transformation can be done so that the $\sigma_i$ are replaced by $S^{-1}\, \sigma_i \, S$. For instance, Girard represents $\{\mathbf I \text{,} \, \mathbf J \text{,} \, \mathbf K\}$ as $\{ -i \, \sigma_x \text{,} \, +i \, \sigma_y \text{,} \, +i \, \sigma_z\}$. He uses a different notation: $\{\mathbf i \text{,} \, \mathbf j \text{,} \, \mathbf k\}$ instead of $\{\mathbf I \text{,} \, \mathbf J \text{,} \, \mathbf K\}$ as the bases of the vector part and $i'$ instead of $i$ as the square root of $-1$. Also, what he calls "complex quaternions" are what we call "biquaternions" in this article.

Everything that follows is by simple replacement of $\mathbf I, \, \mathbf J,\, \mathbf K$ by $-i \, \sigma_x, \, -i \, \sigma_y, \, -i \, \sigma_z$. Except for $X$, lower case letters $q$, $r$, $b$, and $\sigma_i$ are used for 2 × 2 matrices.

What we call a Minkowski 2 × 2 complex matrix is that 2 × 2 complex matrix associated with a Minkowski biquaternion. It has the form

$$X \, = \, t \, 1_{2x2} + x \, \sigma_x + y \, \sigma_y + z \, \sigma_z \, = \, \begin{pmatrix}
t+z & x-i\,y \\
x+i\,y & t-z
\end{pmatrix}$$

Let an arbitrary 2 × 2 matrix have the form $q=a \, 1_{2x2} \, + b \, \sigma_x + c \, \sigma_y + d \, \sigma_z$, where $a$, $b$, $c$, and $d$ are complex. From now on it should be understood that a scalar added to a 2x2 matrix means that it is that scalar multiplied by the 2x2 identity matrix that is to be added, so the $1_{2x2}$ representing the 2x2 identity matrix won't be shown.

- The analog of the biconjugate is $q^* = a - b \, \mathbf \sigma_x - c \, \mathbf \sigma_y - d \, \mathbf \sigma_z$
- The analog of the complex conjugate is $\bar{q} = \bar{a} - \bar{b} \, \mathbf \sigma_x - \bar{c} \, \mathbf \sigma_y - \bar{d} \, \mathbf \sigma_z$
- The analog of the biconjugate of the complex conjugate is the hermitean conjugate (conjugate transpose) since the $\sigma_i$ are hermitean 2 × 2 matrices:

$$\bar{q}^* = q^\dagger=\bar{a} + \bar{b} \, \mathbf \sigma_x + \bar{c} \, \mathbf \sigma_y + \bar{d} \, \mathbf \sigma_z$$

- The analog of the norm is $N(q) = a^2-b^2-c^2-d^2$. This is also its determinant
  $$\begin{vmatrix}
a+d & b-i\,c \\
b+i\,c & a-d
\end{vmatrix}$$
- The Lorentz transformation is $X' = \bar{q}^* \, X \, q = q^\dagger \, X \, q$ for a 2 × 2 matrix q that has norm 1 (determinant 1).

A direction can be represented as $\mathbf n \cdot \mathbf \sigma = n_1\, \sigma_x+n_2 \, \sigma_y + n_3 \, \sigma_z$ where $n_1^2+n_2^2+n_3^2=1$

The spatial rotation is $r=\exp (i \, \tfrac{\theta}{2} \, \mathbf n \cdot \mathbf \sigma )$ so $\bar r^* \equiv r^\dagger = \exp (-i \, \tfrac{\theta}{2} \, \mathbf n \cdot \mathbf \sigma )$

The Lorentz boost is $b=\exp (- \, \tfrac{\alpha}{2} \, \mathbf \mathbf n \cdot \mathbf \sigma )$ so $\bar b^* \equiv b^\dagger = \exp (- \, \tfrac{\alpha}{2} \, \mathbf n \cdot \mathbf \sigma )$

== See also ==
- Biquaternion
- Quaternion
- Lorentz transformation
- Spacetime algebra
