= Bivector (complex) =

Vector part of a biquaternion, has three complex dimensions

In mathematics, a bivector is the vector part of a biquaternion. For biquaternion $q = w + x\mathrm{i} + y\mathrm{j} + z\mathrm{k}$, $w$ is called the biscalar and $x\mathrm{i} + y\mathrm{j} + z\mathrm{k}$ is its bivector part. The coordinates $w$, $x$, $y$, $z$ are complex numbers with imaginary unit $\mathrm{h}$:

$$x = x_1 + \mathrm{h} x_2,\ y = y_1 + \mathrm{h} y_2,\ z = z_1 + \mathrm{h} z_2,  \quad \mathrm{h}^2 = -1 = \mathrm{i}^2 = \mathrm{j}^2 = \mathrm{k}^2 .$$

A bivector may be written as the sum of real and imaginary parts:

$$(x_1 \mathrm{i} + y_1 \mathrm{j} + z_1 \mathrm{k}) + \mathrm{h} (x_2 \mathrm{i} + y_2 \mathrm{j} + z_2 \mathrm{k})$$

where $r_1 = x_1 \mathrm{i} + y_1 \mathrm{j} + z_1 \mathrm{k}$ and $r_2 = x_2 \mathrm{i} + y_2 \mathrm{j} + z_2 \mathrm{k}$ are vectors. Thus the bivector $q = x \mathrm{i} + y \mathrm{j} + z \mathrm{k} = r_1 + \mathrm{h} r_2 .$

In the standard linear representation of biquaternions as 2 × 2 complex matrices acting on the complex plane with basis $\{1, \mathrm{h}\}$,

$$\begin{pmatrix}hv & w+hx\\-w+hx & -hv\end{pmatrix}$$
represents bivector $q = v\mathrm{i} + w\mathrm{j} + x\mathrm{k}$.

The conjugate transpose of this matrix corresponds to $-q$, so the representation of bivector $q$ is a skew-Hermitian matrix.

== History ==
William Rowan Hamilton coined both the terms vector and bivector. The first term was named with quaternions, and the second about a decade later, as in Lectures on Quaternions (1853). Willard Gibbs included a a note on bivectors in his Elements of Vector Analysis (1884). He used bivectors for Edwin Bidwell Wilson's textbook Vector Analysis (1901) based on his lectures. For instance, given a bivector $r=r_1+\mathrm{h}r_2$, the ellipse for which $r_1$ and $r_2$ are a pair of conjugate semi-diameters is called the directional ellipse of the bivector $r$.

Ludwik Silberstein studied a complexified electromagnetic field $E+\mathrm{h}B$, where there are three components, each a complex number, known as the Riemann–Silberstein vector.

A consideration of biquaternion representation of special relativity, using Lie theory, brings bivectors into prominence: The Lie algebra of the Lorentz group is expressed by bivectors. In particular, if $r_1$ and $r_2$ are right versors so that $r_1^2 = -1 = r_2^2$, then the biquaternion curve $\{\exp \theta\, r_1 : \theta \in \mathbf{R}\}$ traces over and over the unit circle in the plane $\{x+yr_1 : x,y\in\mathbf{R}\}$. Such a circle corresponds to the space rotation parameters of the Lorentz group.

Now $(\mathrm{h}r_2)^2=(-1)(-1)=+1$, and the biquaternion curve $\{\exp \theta\ (\mathrm{h}r_2) : \theta \in \mathbf{R}\}$ is a unit hyperbola in the plane $\{x+yr_2 : x,y\in\mathbf{R}\}$. The spacetime transformations in the Lorentz group that lead to FitzGerald contractions and time dilation depend on a hyperbolic angle parameter. In the words of Ronald Shaw, "Bivectors are logarithms of Lorentz transformations."

The commutator product of this Lie algebra is just twice the cross product on $\mathbf{R}^3$, for instance, $[\mathrm{i}, \mathrm{j}] = \mathrm{i}\mathrm{j} - \mathrm{j}\mathrm{i} = 2\mathrm{k}$, which is twice $\mathrm{i}\times\mathrm{j}$. As Shaw wrote in 1970:

Now it is well known that the Lie algebra of the homogeneous Lorentz group can be considered to be that of bivectors under commutation. [...] The Lie algebra of bivectors is essentially that of complex 3-vectors, with the Lie product being defined to be the familiar cross product in (complex) 3-dimensional space.

"Bivectors [...] help describe elliptically polarized homogeneous and inhomogeneous plane waves – one vector for direction of propagation, one for amplitude."
