= Riemann–Silberstein vector =

Complex vector of electromagnetic fields

In mathematical physics, in particular electromagnetism, the Riemann–Silberstein vector or Weber vector named after Bernhard Riemann, Heinrich Martin Weber and Ludwik Silberstein, (or sometimes ambiguously called the "electromagnetic field") is a complex vector that combines the electric field E and the magnetic field B.

== History ==
Heinrich Martin Weber published the fourth edition of "The partial differential equations of mathematical physics according to Riemann's lectures" in two volumes (1900 and 1901). However, Weber pointed out in the preface of the first volume (1900) that this fourth edition was completely rewritten based on his own lectures, not Riemann's, and that the reference to "Riemann's lectures" only remained in the title because the overall concept remained the same and that he continued the work in Riemann's spirit. In the second volume (1901, §138, p. 348), Weber demonstrated how to consolidate Maxwell's equations using $\mathfrak{E} + i\ \mathfrak{M}$. The real and imaginary components of the equation

$$\operatorname{curl}(\mathfrak{E} + i\ \mathfrak{M}) = \frac{i}{c}\ \frac {\partial (\mathfrak{E} + i\ \mathfrak{M})} {\partial t}$$

are an interpretation of Maxwell's equations without charges or currents. It was independently rediscovered and further developed by Ludwik Silberstein in 1907.

== Definition ==
Given an electric field E and a magnetic field B defined on a common region of spacetime, the Riemann–Silberstein vector is
$$\mathbf{F} = \mathbf{E} + ic \mathbf{B} ,$$
where c is the speed of light, with some authors preferring to multiply the right hand side by an overall constant $\sqrt{\varepsilon_0 / 2}$, where ε_{0} is the permittivity of free space. It is analogous to the electromagnetic tensor F, a 2-vector used in the covariant formulation of classical electromagnetism.

In Silberstein's formulation, i was defined as the imaginary unit, and F was defined as a complexified 3-dimensional vector field, called a bivector field.

== Application ==
The Riemann–Silberstein vector is used as a point of reference in the geometric algebra formulation of electromagnetism. Maxwell's four equations in vector calculus reduce to one equation in the algebra of physical space:

$$\left(\frac{1}{c}\dfrac{\partial }{\partial t} + \boldsymbol{\nabla}\right)\mathbf{F} = \frac{1}{\epsilon_0}\left( \rho - \frac{1}{c}\mathbf{J} \right).$$

Expressions for the fundamental invariants and the energy density and momentum density also take on simple forms:

$$\mathbf{F}^2 = \mathbf{E}^2 - c^2\mathbf{B}^2 + 2 i c\mathbf{E} \cdot \mathbf{B}$$
$$\frac{\epsilon_0}{2}\mathbf{F}^{\dagger}  \mathbf{F} = \frac{\epsilon_0}{2}\left( \mathbf{E}^2 + c^2\mathbf{B}^2 \right) + \frac{1}{c} \mathbf{S},$$

where S is the Poynting vector. See also Spacetime algebra for further examples of the above product notation.

The Riemann–Silberstein vector is used for an exact matrix representations of Maxwell's equations in an inhomogeneous medium with sources.

== Photon wave function ==
In 1996 contribution to quantum electrodynamics, Iwo Bialynicki-Birula used the Riemann–Silberstein vector as the basis for an approach to the photon, noting that it is a "complex vector-function of space coordinates r and time t that adequately describes the quantum state of a single photon". To put the Riemann–Silberstein vector in contemporary parlance, a transition is made:

With the advent of spinor calculus that superseded the quaternionic calculus, the transformation properties of the Riemann-Silberstein vector have become even more transparent ... a symmetric second-rank spinor.

Bialynicki-Birula acknowledges that the photon wave function is a controversial concept and that it cannot have all the properties of Schrödinger wave functions of non-relativistic wave mechanics. Yet defense is mounted on the basis of practicality: it is useful for describing quantum states of excitation of a free field, electromagnetic fields acting on a medium, vacuum excitation of virtual positron-electron pairs, and presenting the photon among quantum particles that do have wave functions.

=== Schrödinger equation for the photon and the Heisenberg uncertainty relations ===
Multiplying the two time dependent Maxwell equations by $\hbar$ the Schrödinger equation for photon in the vacuum is given by

$$i \hbar \partial_{t} {\mathbf F}=c (\mathbf S \cdot {\hbar \over i} \nabla) \mathbf F = c (\mathbf S \cdot \mathbf p ) \mathbf F$$

where ${\mathbf S}$ is the vector built from the spin of the length 1 matrices generating full infinitesimal rotations of 3-spinor particle. One may therefore notice that the Hamiltonian in the Schrödinger equation of the photon is the projection of its spin 1 onto its momentum since the normal momentum operator appears there from combining parts of rotations.

In contrast to the electron wave function the modulus square of the wave function of the photon (Riemann-Silbertein vector) is not dimensionless and must be multiplied by the "local photon wavelength" with the proper power to give dimensionless expression to normalize i.e. it is normalized in the exotic way with the integral kernel

$$\|\mathbf F\|={1 \over \hbar c}\int {\mathbf F^*(x) \cdot \mathbf F(x') \over |x-x'|^2}dx^3 dx'^3=1$$

The two residual Maxwell equations are only constraints i.e.

$$\nabla \cdot \mathbf F=0$$

and they are automatically fulfilled all time if only fulfilled at the initial time $t=0$, i.e.

$$\mathbf F(0)= \nabla \times \mathbf  G$$

where $\mathbf G$ is any complex vector field with the non-vanishing rotation, or it is a vector potential for the Riemann–Silberstein vector.

While having the wave function of the photon one can estimate the uncertainty relations for the photon. It shows up that photons are "more quantum" than the electron while their uncertainties of position and the momentum are higher. The natural candidates to estimate the uncertainty are the natural momentum like simply the projection $E/c$ or $H/c$ from Einstein formula for the photoelectric effect and the simplest theory of quanta and the $r$, the uncertainty of the position length vector.

We will use the general relation for the uncertainty for the operators $A, B$

$$\sigma_{A}\sigma_{B} \geq  \frac{1}{2}\left|\langle[\hat{A},\hat{B}]\rangle \right|.$$

We want the uncertainty relation for $\sigma_{r}\sigma_{p}$ i.e. for the operators

$$r^2=x^2+y^2+z^2$$
$$p^2=(\mathbf S \cdot \mathbf p )^2$$

The first step is to find the auxiliary operator $\tilde r$ such that this relation can be used directly. First we make the same trick for $r$ that Dirac made to calculate the square root of the Klein-Gordon operator to get the Dirac equation:

$$\tilde r = \alpha_1 x + \alpha_2 y + \alpha_3 z$$

where $\alpha_i$ are matrices from the Dirac equation:

$$\alpha_i^2=1$$
$$\alpha_i \alpha_k + \alpha_k \alpha_i= 2  \delta_{ik}$$

Therefore, we have

$$\tilde r^2 = r^2$$

Because the spin matrices 1 are only $3 \times 3$ to calculate the commutator in the same space we approximate the spin matrices by angular momentum matrices of the particle with the length $3/2 \approx 1$ while dropping the multiplying $1/2$ since the resulting Maxwell equations in 4 dimensions would look too artificial to the original (alternatively we can keep the original $1/2$ factors but normalize the new 4-spinor to 2 as 4 scalar particles normalized to 1/2):

$$\tilde p^2 = (\mathbf \tilde L \cdot \mathbf p)^2$$

We can now readily calculate the commutator while calculating commutators of $\alpha_i$ matrixes and scaled $\tilde L_i$ and noticing that the symmetric Gaussian state $e^{-a r^2}$ is annihilating in average the terms containing mixed variable like $x p_y$. Calculating 9 commutators (mixed may be zero by Gaussian example and the $L_z \alpha_z=\alpha_z L_z=0$ since those matrices are counter-diagonal) and estimating terms from the norm of the resulting $4 \times 4$ matrix containing four $2\sqrt 3$ factors giving square of the most natural $L2, 1$ norm of this matrix as $48 \approx 49=7^2 \approx 8^2$ and using the norm inequality for the estimate

$$\lVert\mathbf A \mathbf x\rVert \leq \lVert\mathbf A\rVert \lVert\mathbf x\rVert \approx \lVert\mathbf A\rVert \lVert\mathbf x\rVert$$

we obtain

$$\left|\langle[\tilde r,\tilde p]\rangle \right|\geq 8 \hbar .$$

or

$$\sigma_{r}\sigma_{p}\geq 4 \hbar$$

which is much more than for the mass particle in 3 dimensions that is

$$\sigma_{r}\sigma_{p}\geq \frac{3}{2}\hbar$$

and therefore photons turn out to be particles $8/3$ times or almost 3 times "more quantum" than particles with the mass like electrons.

== See also ==
- Matrix representation of Maxwell's equations
