= Relative velocity =

Velocity measured relative to an observer

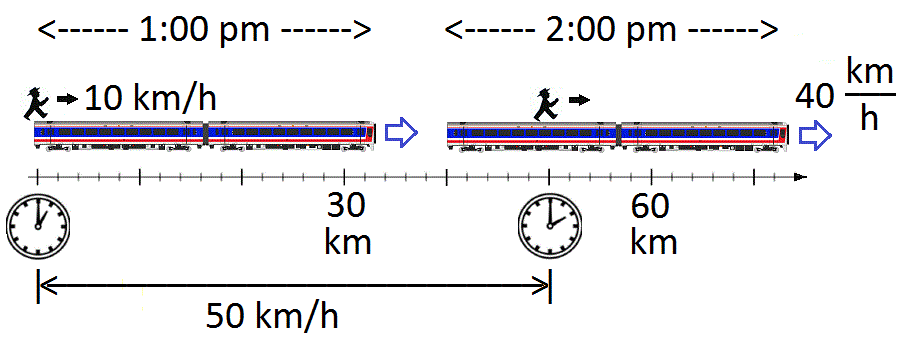
Relative motion man on train

The relative velocity of an object B with respect to an observer A, denoted $\mathbf v_{B\mid A}$ (also $\mathbf v_{BA}$ or $\mathbf v_{B \operatorname{rel} A}$), is the velocity vector of B measured in the rest frame of A. The relative speed is the vector norm of the relative velocity, $v_{B\mid A} = \|\mathbf v_{B\mid A}\|$.

== Classical Mechanics ==
=== In One Dimension (non-relativistic) ===
We begin with relative motion in the classical, (or non-relativistic, or the Newtonian approximation) that all speeds are much less than the speed of light. This limit is associated with the Galilean transformation. The figure shows a man on top of a train, at the back edge. At 1:00 pm he begins to walk forward at a walking speed of 10 km/h (kilometers per hour). The train is moving at 40 km/h. The figure depicts the man and train at two different times: first, when the journey began, and also one hour later at 2:00 pm. The figure suggests that the man is 50 km from the starting point after having traveled (by walking and by train) for one hour. This, by definition, is 50 km/h, which suggests that the prescription for calculating relative velocity in this fashion is to add the two velocities.

The diagram displays clocks and rulers to remind the reader that while the logic behind this calculation seem flawless, it makes false assumptions about how clocks and rulers behave. (See The train-and-platform thought experiment.) To recognize that this classical model of relative motion violates special relativity, we generalize the example into an equation:

$$\underbrace{\mathbf v_{M\mid E}}_\text{50 km/h} = \underbrace{\mathbf v_{M\mid T}}_\text{10 km/h} + \underbrace{\mathbf v_{T\mid E}}_\text{40 km/h},$$

where:

$\mathbf v_{M\mid E}$ is the velocity of the Man relative to Earth,
$\mathbf v_{M\mid T}$ is the velocity of the Man relative to the Train,
$\mathbf v_{T\mid E}$ is the velocity of the Train relative to Earth.

Fully legitimate expressions for "the velocity of A relative to B" include "the velocity of A with respect to B" and "the velocity of A in the coordinate system where B is always at rest". The violation of special relativity occurs because this equation for relative velocity falsely predicts that different observers will measure different speeds when observing the motion of light. (Note: For example, replace the "Man" by a photon traveling at the speed of light.)

=== In two dimensions (non-relativistic) ===
Relative velocities between two particles in classical mechanics

The figure shows two objects A and B moving at constant velocity. The equations of motion are:

$$\mathbf r_A=\mathbf r_{Ai}+\mathbf v_A t,$$

$$\mathbf r_B=\mathbf r_{Bi}+ \mathbf v_B t,$$

where the subscript i refers to the initial displacement (at time t equal to zero). The difference between the two displacement vectors, $\mathbf r_B-\mathbf r_A$, represents the location of B as seen from A.

$$\mathbf r_B-\mathbf r_A= \underbrace{\mathbf r_{Bi}-\mathbf r_{Ai}}_\text{initial separation} + \underbrace{(\mathbf v_B-\mathbf v_A ) t}_\text{relative velocity}.$$

Hence:

$$\mathbf v_{B\mid A}=\mathbf v_B-\mathbf v_A.$$

After making the substitutions $\mathbf v_{A|C}=\mathbf v_A$ and $\mathbf v_{B|C}=\mathbf v_B$, we have:

$\mathbf v_{B\mid A} = \mathbf v_{B\mid C}-\mathbf v_{A\mid C} \Rightarrow$ $\mathbf v_{B\mid C}=\mathbf v_{B\mid A} +\mathbf v_{A\mid C}.$

=== Galilean transformation (non-relativistic) ===
To construct a theory of relative motion consistent with the theory of special relativity, we must adopt a different convention. Continuing to work in the (non-relativistic) Newtonian limit we begin with a Galilean transformation in one dimension: (Note: This result is valid if all motion is restricted to the x-axis, but can be easily generalized by replacing the first equation by $\mathbf r\,'=\mathbf r-\mathbf vt$)

$$x'=x-vt$$
$$t'=t$$

where x' is the position as seen by a reference frame that is moving at speed, v, in the "unprimed" (x) reference frame. (Note: It is easy to be confused about the minus sign before v, or whether v is defined in the prime or unprimed reference frame. It might help to visualize the fact that if x = vt, then x′ = 0, meaning that a particle that is following the path x = vt is at rest in the primed reference frame.) Taking the differential of the first of the two equations above, we have, $dx'=dx-v \, dt$, and what may seem like the obvious (Note: Keep in mind that, due to time dilation, dt = dt′ is valid only in the approximation that the speed is much less than that of light.) statement that $dt'=dt$, we have:

$$\frac{dx'}{dt'}=\frac{dx}{dt}-v$$

To recover the previous expressions for relative velocity, we assume that particle A is following the path defined by dx/dt in the unprimed reference (and hence dx′/dt′ in the primed frame). Thus $dx/dt = v_{A\mid O}$ and $dx'/dt = v_{A\mid O'}$, where $O$ and $O'$ refer to motion of A as seen by an observer in the unprimed and primed frame, respectively. Recall that v is the motion of a stationary object in the primed frame, as seen from the unprimed frame. Thus we have $v=v_{O'\mid O}$, and:

$$v_{A\mid O'}= v_{A\mid O}-v_{O'\mid O} \Rightarrow v_{A\mid O} = v_{A\mid O'} + v_{O'\mid O},$$

where the latter form has the desired (easily learned) symmetry.

== Special relativity ==
As in classical mechanics, in special relativity the relative velocity $\mathbf v_\mathrm{B|A}$ is the velocity of an object or observer B in the rest frame of another object or observer A. However, unlike the case of classical mechanics, in Special Relativity, it is generally not the case that

$$\mathbf v_\mathrm{B|A}=-\mathbf v_\mathrm{A|B}$$

This peculiar lack of symmetry is related to Thomas precession and the fact that two successive Lorentz transformations rotate the coordinate system. This rotation has no effect on the magnitude of a vector, and hence relative speed is symmetrical.

$$\|\mathbf v_\mathrm{B|A}\|=\|\mathbf v_\mathrm{A|B}\|=v_\mathrm{B|A}=v_\mathrm{A|B}$$

=== Parallel velocities ===
In the case where two objects are traveling in parallel directions, the relativistic formula for relative velocity is similar in form to the formula for addition of relativistic velocities.

$$\mathbf v_\mathrm{B|A}=\frac{\mathbf v_\mathrm{B}-\mathbf v_\mathrm{A}}{1-\frac{\mathbf v_\mathrm{A}\mathbf v_\mathrm{B}}{c^2}}$$

The relative speed is given by the formula:

$$v_\mathrm{B|A}=\frac{\left | \mathbf v_\mathrm{B}-\mathbf v_\mathrm{A}\right | }{1-\frac{\mathbf v_\mathrm{A}\mathbf v_\mathrm{B}}{c^2}}$$

=== Perpendicular velocities ===
In the case where two objects are traveling in perpendicular directions, the relativistic relative velocity $\mathbf v_\mathrm{B|A}$ is given by the formula:

$$\mathbf v_\mathrm{B|A}={\frac{\mathbf v_\mathrm{B}}{\gamma_\mathrm{A}}}-\mathbf v_\mathrm{A}$$

where

$$\gamma_\mathrm{A}=\frac{1}{\sqrt{1 - \left( \frac{v_\mathrm{A}}{c} \right)^2}}$$

The relative speed is given by the formula

$$v_\mathrm{B|A} = \frac{\sqrt{c^4 - \left(c^2-v_\mathrm{A}^2\right) \left(c^2 -v_\mathrm{B}^2\right)}}{c}$$

=== General case ===
The general formula for the relative velocity $\mathbf v_\mathrm{B|A}$ of an object or observer B in the rest frame of another object or observer A is given by the formula:

$$\mathbf v_\mathrm{B|A} = \frac 1 {\gamma_\mathrm{A} \left(1-\frac{\mathbf v_\mathrm{A}\mathbf v_\mathrm{B}}{c^2} \right )} \left[ \mathbf v_\mathrm{B}-\mathbf v_\mathrm{A}+\mathbf v_\mathrm{A}(\gamma_\mathrm{A}-1) \left( \frac{\mathbf v_\mathrm{A}\cdot \mathbf v_\mathrm{B}}{v_\mathrm{A}^2}-1 \right) \right]$$

where

$$\gamma_\mathrm{A} = \frac{1}{\sqrt{1-\left(\frac{v_\mathrm{A}}{c}\right)^2}}$$

The relative speed is given by the formula

$$v_\mathrm{B|A}=\sqrt{1-\frac{\left(c^2-v_\mathrm{A}^2\right)\left(c^2 -v_\mathrm{B}^2\right)}{\left(c^2-\mathbf v_\mathrm{A} \cdot \mathbf v_\mathrm{B}\right)^2}} \cdot c$$

== See also ==
- Doppler effect
- Non-Euclidean geometry § Kinematic geometries
- Peculiar velocity
- Proper motion
- Range rate
- Radial velocity
- Rapidity
- Relativistic speed
- Space velocity (astronomy)
