= Velocity-addition formula =

Equation used in relativistic physics

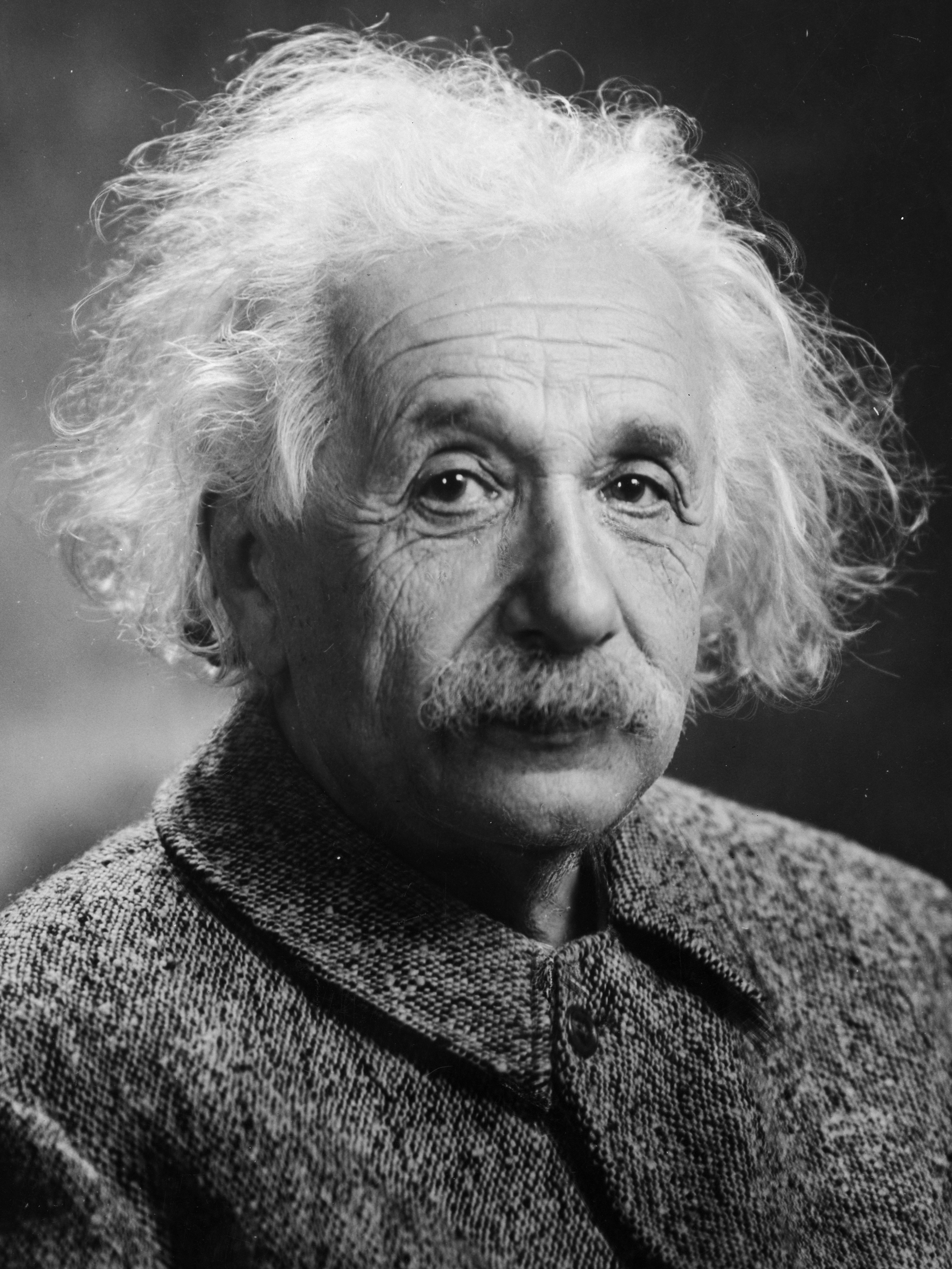
The special theory of relativity, formulated in 1905 by Albert Einstein, implies that addition of velocities does not behave in accordance with simple vector addition.

In relativistic physics, a velocity-addition formula is an equation that specifies how to combine the velocities of objects in a way that is consistent with the requirement that no object's speed can exceed the speed of light. Such formulas apply to successive Lorentz transformations, so they also relate different frames. Accompanying velocity addition is a kinematic effect known as Thomas precession, whereby successive non-collinear Lorentz boosts become equivalent to the composition of a rotation of the coordinate system and a boost.

Standard applications of velocity-addition formulas include the Doppler shift, Doppler navigation, the aberration of light, and the dragging of light in moving water observed in the 1851 Fizeau experiment.

The notation employs u as velocity of a body within a Lorentz frame S, and v as velocity of a second frame S′, as measured in S, and u′ as the transformed velocity of the body within the second frame.

== History ==
The speed of light in a fluid is slower than the speed of light in vacuum, and it changes if the fluid is moving along with the light. In 1851, Fizeau measured the speed of light in a fluid moving parallel to the light using an interferometer. Fizeau's results were not in accord with the then-prevalent theories. Fizeau experimentally correctly determined the zeroth term of an expansion of the relativistically correct addition law in terms of V/c as is described below. Fizeau's result led physicists to accept the empirical validity of the rather unsatisfactory theory by Fresnel that a fluid moving with respect to the stationary aether partially drags light with it, i.e. the speed is c/n + (1 − 1/n^{2})V instead of c/n + V, where c is the speed of light in the aether, n is the refractive index of the fluid, and V is the speed of the fluid with respect to the aether.

The aberration of light, of which the easiest explanation is the relativistic velocity addition formula, together with Fizeau's result, triggered the development of theories like Lorentz aether theory of electromagnetism in 1892. In 1905 Albert Einstein, with the advent of special relativity, derived the standard configuration formula (V in the x-direction) for the addition of relativistic velocities. The issues involving aether were, gradually over the years, settled in favor of special relativity.

== Galilean relativity ==
It was observed by Galileo that a person on a uniformly moving ship has the impression of being at rest and sees a heavy body falling vertically downward. This observation is now regarded as the first clear statement of the principle of mechanical relativity. Galileo saw that from the point of view of a person standing on the shore, the motion of falling downwards on the ship would be combined with, or added to, the forward motion of the ship. In terms of velocities, it can be said that the velocity of the falling body relative to the shore equals the velocity of that body relative to ship plus the velocity of the ship relative to the shore.

In general for three objects A (e.g. Galileo on the shore), B (e.g. ship), C (e.g. falling body on ship) the velocity vector $\mathbf{u}$ of C relative to A (velocity of falling object as Galileo sees it) is the sum of the velocity $\mathbf{u'}$ of C relative to B (velocity of falling object relative to ship) plus the velocity v of B relative to A (ship's velocity away from the shore). The addition here is the vector addition of vector algebra and the resulting velocity is usually represented in the form

$$\mathbf{u} = \mathbf{v} + \mathbf{u'}.$$

The cosmos of Galileo consists of absolute space and time and the addition of velocities corresponds to composition of Galilean transformations. The relativity principle is called Galilean relativity. It is obeyed by Newtonian mechanics.

== Special relativity ==
According to the theory of special relativity, the frame of the ship has a different clock rate and distance measure, and the notion of simultaneity in the direction of motion is altered, so the addition law for velocities is changed. This change is not noticeable at low velocities but as the velocity increases towards the speed of light it becomes important. The addition law is also called a composition law for velocities. For collinear motions, the speed of the object, $u'$, e.g. a cannonball fired horizontally out to sea, as measured from the ship, moving at speed $v$, would be measured by someone standing on the shore and watching the whole scene through a telescope as
$$u = {v+u'\over 1+(vu'/c^2)} .$$
The composition formula can take an algebraically equivalent form, which can be easily derived by using only the principle of constancy of the speed of light,
$${c-u \over c+u} = \left({c-u' \over c+u'}\right)\left({c-v \over c+v}\right).$$
The cosmos of special relativity consists of Minkowski spacetime and the addition of velocities corresponds to composition of Lorentz transformations. In the special theory of relativity Newtonian mechanics is modified into relativistic mechanics.

== Standard configuration ==
The formulas for boosts in the standard configuration follow most straightforwardly from taking differentials of the inverse Lorentz boost in standard configuration. If the primed frame is travelling with speed $v$ with Lorentz factor $\gamma_{_v} = 1/\sqrt{1-v^2/c^2}$ in the positive x-direction relative to the unprimed frame, then the differentials are

$$dx = \gamma_{_v}(dx' + vdt'), \quad dy = dy', \quad dz = dz', \quad dt = \gamma_{_v}\left(dt' + \frac{v}{c^2}dx'\right).$$

Divide the first three equations by the fourth,

$$\frac{dx}{dt} = \frac{\gamma_{_v}(dx' + vdt')}{\gamma_{_v}(dt' + \frac{v}{c^2}dx')},
\quad \frac{dy}{dt} = \frac{dy'}{\gamma_{_v}(dt' + \frac{v}{c^2}dx')}, \quad \frac{dz}{dt} = \frac{dz'}{\gamma_{_v}(dt' + \frac{v}{c^2}dx')},$$

or

$$u_x = \frac{dx}{dt} = \frac{\frac{dx'}{dt'} + v}{(1 + \frac{v}{c^2}\frac{dx'}{dt'})},
\quad u_y = \frac{dy}{dt} = \frac{\frac{dy'}{dt'}}{\gamma_{_v} \ (1 + \frac{v}{c^2}\frac{dx'}{dt'})},
\quad u_z = \frac{dz}{dt} = \frac{\frac{dz'}{dt'}}{\gamma_{_v} \ (1 + \frac{v}{c^2}\frac{dx'}{dt'})},$$

which is

Transformation of velocity (Cartesian components)

$$u_x = \frac{u_x' + v}{1 + \frac{v}{c^2}u_x'}, \quad u_x' = \frac{u_x - v}{1 - \frac{v}{c^2}u_x},$$
$$u_y = \frac{u_y'\sqrt{1-\frac{v^2}{c^2}}}{1 + \frac{v}{c^2}u_x'}, \quad u_y' = \frac{u_y\sqrt{1-\frac{v^2}{c^2}}}{1 - \frac{v}{c^2}u_x},$$
$$u_z = \frac{u_z'\sqrt{1-\frac{v^2}{c^2}}}{1 + \frac{v}{c^2}u_x'}, \quad u_z' = \frac{u_z\sqrt{1-\frac{v^2}{c^2}}}{1 - \frac{v}{c^2}u_x},$$

in which expressions for the primed velocities were obtained using the standard recipe by replacing v by –v and swapping primed and unprimed coordinates. If coordinates are chosen so that all velocities lie in a (common) x–y plane, then velocities may be expressed as
$$u_x = u\cos \theta, u_y = u\sin \theta,\quad u_x' = u'\cos \theta', \quad u_y' = u'\sin \theta',$$
(see polar coordinates) and one finds

Transformation of velocity (Plane polar components)

$$u = \frac{\sqrt{u'^2 +v^2+2vu'\cos \theta' - \left(\frac{vu'\sin\theta'}{c}\right)^2}}{1 + \frac{v}{c^2}u'\cos \theta'},$$
$\tan \theta = \frac{u_y}{u_x} = \frac{\sqrt{1-\frac{v^2}{c^2}}u_y'}{u_x' + v} = \frac{\sqrt{1-\frac{v^2}{c^2}}u'\sin \theta'}{u'\cos \theta' + v}.$

Details for u

$$\begin{align}
u &= \sqrt{u_x^2 + u_y^2} = \frac{\sqrt{(u_x'+v)^2 + (1-\frac{v^2}{c^2})u_y'^2}}{1 + \frac{v}{c^2}u_x'}
= \frac{\sqrt{u_x'^2+v^2+2u_x'v + (1-\frac{v^2}{c^2})u_y'^2}}{1 + \frac{v}{c^2}u_x'}\\
&=\frac{\sqrt{u'^2 \cos^2 \theta'+v^2+2vu'\cos \theta' + u'^2\sin^2\theta' - \frac{v^2}{c^2}u'^2\sin^2\theta'}}{1 + \frac{v}{c^2}u_x'}\\
&=\frac{\sqrt{u'^2 +v^2+2vu'\cos \theta' - (\frac{vu'\sin\theta'}{c})^2}}{1 + \frac{v}{c^2}u'\cos \theta'}
\end{align}$$

The proof as given is highly formal. There are other more involved proofs that may be more enlightening, such as the one below.

A proof using 4-vectors and Lorentz transformation matrices

Since a relativistic transformation rotates space and time into each other much as geometric rotations in the plane rotate the x- and y-axes, it is convenient to use the same units for space and time, otherwise a unit conversion factor appears throughout relativistic formulae, being the speed of light. In a system where lengths and times are measured in the same units, the speed of light is dimensionless and equal to 1. A velocity is then expressed as fraction of the speed of light.

To find the relativistic transformation law, it is useful to introduce the four-velocities V = (V_{0}, V_{1}, 0, 0), which is the motion of the ship away from the shore, as measured from the shore, and U′ = (U′_{0}, U′_{1}, U′_{2}, U′_{3}) which is the motion of the fly away from the ship, as measured from the ship. The four-velocity is defined to be a four-vector with relativistic length equal to 1, future-directed and tangent to the world line of the object in spacetime. Here, V_{0} corresponds to the time component and V_{1} to the x component of the ship's velocity as seen from the shore. It is convenient to take the x-axis to be the direction of motion of the ship away from the shore, and the y-axis so that the x–y plane is the plane spanned by the motion of the ship and the fly. This results in several components of the velocities being zero: V_{2} = V_{3} = U′_{3} = 0

The ordinary velocity is the ratio of the rate at which the space coordinates are increasing to the rate at which the time coordinate is increasing:

$$\begin{align}
\mathbf{v}  &= (v_1, v_2, v_3) = (V_1/V_0, 0, 0),\\
\mathbf{u}' &= (u'_1, u'_2, u'_3) = (U'_1/U'_0, U'_2/U'_0, 0)
\end{align}$$

Since the relativistic length of V is 1,
$$V_0^2 - V_1^2 = 1,$$
so
$$V_0 = 1/\sqrt{1-v_1^2} \ = \gamma, \quad V_1 = v_1/\sqrt{1-v_1^2} =  v_1 \gamma .$$

The Lorentz transformation matrix that converts velocities measured in the ship frame to the shore frame is the inverse of the transformation described on the Lorentz transformation page, so the minus signs that appear there must be inverted here:

$$\begin{pmatrix} \gamma &  v_1 \gamma & 0 & 0 \\  v_1 \gamma & \gamma & 0 & 0 \\ 0 & 0 & 1 & 0 \\ 0 & 0 & 0 & 1 \end{pmatrix}$$

This matrix rotates the pure time-axis vector (1, 0, 0, 0) to (V_{0}, V_{1}, 0, 0), and all its columns are relativistically orthogonal to one another, so it defines a Lorentz transformation.

If a fly is moving with four-velocity U′ in the ship frame, and it is boosted by multiplying by the matrix above, the new four-velocity in the shore frame is U = (U_{0}, U_{1}, U_{2}, U_{3}),
$$\begin{align} U_0 &= V_0 U'_0 + V_1 U'_1,\\
U_1 &= V_1 U'_0 + V_0 U'_1,\\
U_2 &= U'_2,\\
U_3 &= U'_3.\end{align}$$

Dividing by the time component U_{0} and substituting for the components of the four-vectors U′ and V in terms of the components of the three-vectors u′ and v gives the relativistic composition law as

$$\begin{align} u_1 &= { v_1 + u'_1 \over 1 + v_1 u'_1 },\\
u_2 &= { u'_2 \over (1 + v_1 u'_1) }{ 1 \over V_0 } = { u'_2 \over 1 + v_1 u'_1 } \sqrt{1 - v_1^2},\\
u_3 &= 0\end{align}$$

The form of the relativistic composition law can be understood as an effect of the failure of simultaneity at a distance. For the parallel component, the time dilation decreases the speed, the length contraction increases it, and the two effects cancel out. The failure of simultaneity means that the fly is changing slices of simultaneity as the projection of u′ onto v. Since this effect is entirely due to the time slicing, the same factor multiplies the perpendicular component, but for the perpendicular component there is no length contraction, so the time dilation multiplies by a factor of 1/V_{0} = √(1 − v_{1}^{2}).

== General configuration ==
Decomposition of 3-velocity u into parallel and perpendicular components, and calculation of the components. The procedure for u′ is identical.

Starting from the expression in coordinates for v parallel to the x-axis, expressions for the perpendicular and parallel components can be cast in vector form as follows, a trick which also works for Lorentz transformations of other 3d physical quantities originally in set up standard configuration. Introduce the velocity vector u in the unprimed frame and u′ in the primed frame, and split them into components parallel (∥) and perpendicular (⊥) to the relative velocity vector v (see hide box below) thus
$$\mathbf{u} = \mathbf{u}_\parallel + \mathbf{u}_\perp,\quad \mathbf{u}' = \mathbf{u}'_\parallel + \mathbf{u}'_\perp ,$$
then with the usual Cartesian standard basis vectors e_{x}, e_{y}, e_{z}, set the velocity in the unprimed frame to be
$$\mathbf{u}_\parallel = u_x \mathbf{e}_x,\quad \mathbf{u}_\perp = u_y \mathbf{e}_y + u_z \mathbf{e}_z ,\quad \mathbf{v} = v\mathbf{e}_x,$$
which gives, using the results for the standard configuration,
$$\mathbf u_\parallel = \frac{\mathbf u_\parallel' + \mathbf v}{1 + \frac{\mathbf v \cdot \mathbf u_\parallel'}{c^2}},
\quad \mathbf u_\perp = \frac{\sqrt{1-\frac{v^2}{c^2}}\mathbf u_\perp'}{1 + \frac{\mathbf v\cdot \mathbf u_\parallel'}{c^2}}.$$
where · is the dot product. Since these are vector equations, they still have the same form for v in any direction. The only difference from the coordinate expressions is that the above expressions refers to vectors, not components.

One obtains
$$\mathbf{u} = \mathbf u_\parallel + \mathbf u_\perp = \frac{1}{1+\frac{\mathbf{v}\cdot\mathbf{u}'}{c^{2}}}\left[\alpha_v\mathbf{u}'+ \mathbf{v} + (1-\alpha_v)\frac{(\mathbf{v}\cdot\mathbf{u}')}{v^{2}}\mathbf{v}\right] \equiv \mathbf v \oplus \mathbf u',$$
where α_{v} = 1/γ_{v} is the reciprocal of the Lorentz factor. The ordering of operands in the definition is chosen to coincide with that of the standard configuration from which the formula is derived.

The algebra

$$\begin{align}
\frac{\mathbf u'_\parallel + \mathbf v}{1 + \frac{\mathbf v \cdot \mathbf u'}{c^2}} + \frac{\alpha_v \mathbf u'_\perp}{1 + \frac{\mathbf v \cdot \mathbf u'}{c^2}} &= \frac{\mathbf v + \frac{\mathbf v \cdot \mathbf u'}{v^2}\mathbf v}{1 + \frac{\mathbf v \cdot \mathbf u'}{c^2}}
+ \frac{\alpha_v \mathbf u' - \alpha_v\frac{\mathbf v \cdot \mathbf u'}{v^2}\mathbf v}{1 + \frac{\mathbf v \cdot \mathbf u'}{c^2}}\\
&=\frac{1 + \frac{\mathbf v \cdot \mathbf u'}{v^2}(1 - \alpha_v)}{1 + \frac{\mathbf v \cdot \mathbf u'}{c^2}}\mathbf v +
\alpha_v\frac{1}{1 + \frac{\mathbf v \cdot \mathbf u'}{c^2}}\mathbf u'\\
&=\frac{1}{1 + \frac{\mathbf v \cdot \mathbf u'}{c^2}}\mathbf v +
\alpha_v\frac{1}{1 + \frac{\mathbf v \cdot \mathbf u'}{c^2}}\mathbf u' +
\frac{1}{1 + \frac{\mathbf v \cdot \mathbf u'}{c^2}}\frac{\mathbf v \cdot \mathbf u'}{v^2}(1 - \alpha_v)\mathbf v\\
&=\frac{1}{1 + \frac{\mathbf v \cdot \mathbf u'}{c^2}}\mathbf v +
\alpha_v\frac{1}{1 + \frac{\mathbf v \cdot \mathbf u'}{c^2}}\mathbf u' +
\frac{1}{c^2}\frac{1}{1 + \frac{\mathbf v \cdot \mathbf u'}{c^2}}\frac{\mathbf v \cdot \mathbf u'}{v^2/c^2}(1 - \alpha_v)\mathbf v\\
&=\frac{1}{1 + \frac{\mathbf v \cdot \mathbf u'}{c^2}}\mathbf v +
\alpha_v\frac{1}{1 + \frac{\mathbf v \cdot \mathbf u'}{c^2}}\mathbf u' +
\frac{1}{c^2}\frac{1}{1 + \frac{\mathbf v \cdot \mathbf u'}{c^2}}\frac{\mathbf v \cdot \mathbf u'}{(1-\alpha_v)(1+\alpha_v)}(1 - \alpha_v)\mathbf v\\
&= \frac{1}{1+\frac{\mathbf{v}\cdot\mathbf{u}'}{c^{2}}}\left[\alpha_v\mathbf{u}'+ \mathbf{v} + (1-\alpha_v)\frac{(\mathbf{v}\cdot\mathbf{u}')}{v^{2}}\mathbf{v}\right].
\end{align}$$

Decomposition into parallel and perpendicular components in terms of V

Either the parallel or the perpendicular component for each vector needs to be found, since the other component will be eliminated by substitution of the full vectors.

The parallel component of u′ can be found by projecting the full vector into the direction of the relative motion
$$\mathbf{u}'_\parallel = \frac{\mathbf{v} \cdot \mathbf{u}'}{v^2}\mathbf v,$$
and the perpendicular component of u′ can be found by the geometric properties of the cross product (see figure above right),
$$\mathbf{u}'_\perp = - \frac{\mathbf{v} \times (\mathbf{v} \times \mathbf{u}')}{v^2}.$$

In each case, v/v is a unit vector in the direction of relative motion.

The expressions for u_{∥} and u_{⊥} can be found in the same way. Substituting the parallel component into
$$\mathbf u = \frac{\mathbf u_\parallel' + \mathbf v}{1 + \frac{\mathbf v \cdot \mathbf u_\parallel'}{c^2}}
+\frac{\sqrt{1-\frac{v^2}{c^2}}(\mathbf u' - \mathbf u_\parallel')}{1 + \frac{\mathbf v\cdot \mathbf u_\parallel'}{c^2}},$$

results in the above equation.

Using an identity in $\alpha_v$ and $\gamma_v$, (Note: These formulae follow from inverting α_{v} for v^{2} and applying the difference of two squares to obtain v^{2} = c^{2}(1 − α_{v}^{2}) = c^{2}(1 − α_{v})(1 + α_{v}) so that ((1 − α_{v}))/v^{2} = 1/(c^{2}(1 + α_{v})) = γ_{v}/(c^{2}(1 + γ_{v})).)

$$\begin{align}
\mathbf v \oplus \mathbf u' \equiv \mathbf u &=\frac{1}{1 + \frac{\mathbf u' \cdot \mathbf v}{c^2}}\left[\mathbf v +
\frac{\mathbf u'}{\gamma_v} + \frac{1}{c^2}\frac{\gamma_v}{1+\gamma_v}(\mathbf u' \cdot \mathbf v)\mathbf v\right]\\
&= \frac{1}{1 + \frac{\mathbf u' \cdot \mathbf v}{c^2}}\left[\mathbf v + \mathbf u' +
\frac{1}{c^2}\frac{\gamma_v}{1+\gamma_v} \mathbf v \times(\mathbf v \times \mathbf u')\right],
\end{align}$$
and in the forwards (v positive, S → S') direction
$$\begin{align}
\mathbf v \oplus \mathbf u \equiv \mathbf u' &=\frac{1}{1 - \frac{\mathbf u \cdot \mathbf v}{c^2}}\left[\frac{\mathbf u}{\gamma_v} - \mathbf v + \frac{1}{c^2}\frac{\gamma_v}{1+\gamma_v}(\mathbf u \cdot \mathbf v)\mathbf v\right]\\
&= \frac{1}{1 - \frac{\mathbf u \cdot \mathbf v}{c^2}}\left[ \mathbf u - \mathbf v +
\frac{1}{c^2}\frac{\gamma_v}{1+\gamma_v} \mathbf v \times(\mathbf v \times \mathbf u)\right]
\end{align}$$

where the last expression is by the standard vector analysis formula v × (v × u) = (v ⋅ u)v − (v ⋅ v)u. The first expression extends to any number of spatial dimensions, but the cross product is defined in three dimensions only. The objects A, B, C with B having velocity v relative to A and C having velocity u relative to A can be anything. In particular, they can be three frames, or they could be the laboratory, a decaying particle and one of the decay products of the decaying particle.

=== Properties ===
The relativistic addition of 3-velocities is non-linear, so in general
$$(\lambda \mathbf{v}) \oplus (\lambda \mathbf{u}) \neq \lambda (\mathbf{v} \oplus \mathbf{u}) ,$$
for real number λ, although it is true that
$$(-\mathbf{v}) \oplus (-\mathbf{u}) = - (\mathbf{v} \oplus \mathbf{u}) ,$$

Also, due to the last terms, is in general neither commutative
$$\mathbf v \oplus \mathbf u  \ne \mathbf u \oplus \mathbf v,$$
nor associative
$$\mathbf v \oplus (\mathbf u \oplus \mathbf w) \ne (\mathbf v \oplus \mathbf u) \oplus \mathbf w.$$

It deserves special mention that if u and v′ refer to velocities of pairwise parallel frames (primed parallel to unprimed and doubly primed parallel to primed), then, according to Einstein's velocity reciprocity principle, the unprimed frame moves with velocity −u relative to the primed frame, and the primed frame moves with velocity −v′ relative to the doubly primed frame hence (−v′ ⊕ −u) is the velocity of the unprimed frame relative to the doubly primed frame, and one might expect to have u ⊕ v′ = −(−v′ ⊕ −u) by naive application of the reciprocity principle. This does not hold, though the magnitudes are equal. The unprimed and doubly primed frames are not parallel, but related through a rotation. This is related to the phenomenon of Thomas precession, and is not dealt with further here.

The norms are given by
$$| \mathbf u |^2 \equiv |\mathbf v \oplus \mathbf u'|^2 = \frac{1}{\left(1+\frac{\mathbf v \cdot \mathbf u'}{c^2}\right)^2}\left[\left(\mathbf v + \mathbf u' \right)^2 - \frac{1}{c^2}\left(\mathbf v \times \mathbf u'\right)^2 \right] = |\mathbf u' \oplus \mathbf v|^2.$$
and
$$| \mathbf u' |^2 \equiv |\mathbf v \oplus \mathbf u|^2 = \frac{1}{\left(1-\frac{\mathbf v \cdot \mathbf u}{c^2}\right)^2}\left[\left(\mathbf u - \mathbf v \right)^2 - \frac{1}{c^2}\left(\mathbf v \times \mathbf u\right)^2 \right] = |\mathbf u \oplus \mathbf v|^2.$$

Proof

$$\begin{align}
&\left(1+\frac{\mathbf v \cdot \mathbf u'}{c^2}\right)^2|\mathbf v \oplus \mathbf u'|^2\\
&= \left[ \mathbf v + \mathbf u' + \frac{1}{c^2}\frac{\gamma_v}{1+\gamma_v}\mathbf v \times(\mathbf v \times \mathbf u')\right]^2\\
&=(\mathbf v + \mathbf u')^2 +2\frac{1}{c^2} \frac{\gamma_v}{\gamma_v + 1}  \left[(\mathbf v \cdot \mathbf u')^2-(\mathbf v\cdot\mathbf v)(\mathbf u'\cdot\mathbf u')\right] + \frac{1}{c^4}\left(\frac{\gamma_v}{\gamma_v + 1}\right)^2\left[(\mathbf v\cdot\mathbf v)^2(\mathbf u' \cdot \mathbf u') - (\mathbf v\cdot \mathbf u')^2(\mathbf v\cdot \mathbf v)\right]\\
&=(\mathbf v + \mathbf u')^2 +2\frac{1}{c^2} \frac{\gamma_v}{\gamma_v + 1}  \left[(\mathbf v \cdot \mathbf u')^2-(\mathbf v\cdot\mathbf v)(\mathbf u'\cdot\mathbf u')\right]
+ \frac{v^2}{c^4}\left(\frac{\gamma_v}{\gamma_v + 1}\right)^2\left[(\mathbf v\cdot\mathbf v)(\mathbf u' \cdot \mathbf u') - (\mathbf v\cdot \mathbf u')^2\right]\\
&=(\mathbf v + \mathbf u')^2 +2\frac{1}{c^2} \frac{\gamma_v}{\gamma_v + 1}  \left[(\mathbf v \cdot \mathbf u')^2-(\mathbf v\cdot\mathbf v)(\mathbf u'\cdot\mathbf u')\right]
+ \frac{(1-\alpha_v)(1+\alpha_v)}{c^2}\left(\frac{\gamma_v}{\gamma_v + 1}\right)^2\left[(\mathbf v\cdot\mathbf v)(\mathbf u' \cdot \mathbf u') - (\mathbf v\cdot \mathbf u')^2\right]\\
&=(\mathbf v + \mathbf u')^2 +2\frac{1}{c^2} \frac{\gamma_v}{\gamma_v + 1}  \left[(\mathbf v \cdot \mathbf u')^2-(\mathbf v\cdot\mathbf v)(\mathbf u'\cdot\mathbf u')\right]
+ \frac{(\gamma_v-1)}{c^2(\gamma_v + 1)}\left[(\mathbf v\cdot\mathbf v)(\mathbf u' \cdot \mathbf u') - (\mathbf v\cdot \mathbf u')^2\right]\\
&=(\mathbf v + \mathbf u')^2 +2\frac{1}{c^2} \frac{\gamma_v}{\gamma_v + 1}  \left[(\mathbf v \cdot \mathbf u')^2-(\mathbf v\cdot\mathbf v)(\mathbf u'\cdot\mathbf u')\right]
+ \frac{(1-\gamma_v)}{c^2(\gamma_v + 1)}\left[(\mathbf v\cdot \mathbf u')^2 - (\mathbf v\cdot\mathbf v)(\mathbf u' \cdot \mathbf u')\right] \\
&=(\mathbf v + \mathbf u')^2 +\frac{1}{c^2} \frac{\gamma_v+1}{\gamma_v + 1}  \left[(\mathbf v \cdot \mathbf u')^2-(\mathbf v\cdot\mathbf v)(\mathbf u'\cdot\mathbf u')\right]\\
&=(\mathbf v + \mathbf u')^2 -\frac{1}{c^2}  |\mathbf v \times \mathbf u'|^2
\end{align}$$
Reverse formula found by using standard procedure of swapping v for −v and u for u′.

It is clear that the non-commutativity manifests itself as an additional rotation of the coordinate frame when two boosts are involved, since the norm squared is the same for both orders of boosts.

The gamma factors for the combined velocities are computed as
$$\gamma_u = \gamma_{\mathbf v \oplus \mathbf u'} =\left[ 1 -   \frac{1}{c^2}\frac{1}{(1+\frac{\mathbf v \cdot \mathbf u'}{c^2})^2}
\left( (\mathbf v + \mathbf u')^2 - \frac{1}{c^2}(v^2u'^2 - (\mathbf v \cdot \mathbf u')^2)\right)\right]^{-\frac{1}{2}}=\gamma_v\gamma_u'\left(1+\frac{\mathbf v \cdot \mathbf u'}{c^2}\right), \quad \quad \gamma_u' = \gamma_v\gamma_u\left(1-\frac{\mathbf v \cdot \mathbf u}{c^2}\right)$$

Detailed proof

$$\begin{align}
\gamma_{\mathbf v \oplus \mathbf u'} &= \left[ \frac{c^3(1+\frac{\mathbf v \cdot \mathbf u'}{c^2})^2}{c^2(1+\frac{\mathbf v \cdot \mathbf u'}{c^2})^2}
-   \frac{1}{c^2}\frac{ (\mathbf v + \mathbf u')^2 - \frac{1}{c^2}(v^2u'^2 - (\mathbf v \cdot \mathbf u')^2)}{(1+\frac{\mathbf v \cdot \mathbf u'}{c^2})^2}\right]^{-\frac{1}{2}}\\
&=\left[ \frac{c^2(1+\frac{\mathbf v \cdot \mathbf u'}{c^2})^2 - (\mathbf v + \mathbf u')^2 + \frac{1}{c^2}(v^2u'^2 - (\mathbf v \cdot \mathbf u')^2)}{c^2(1+\frac{\mathbf v \cdot \mathbf u'}{c^2})^2}
\right]^{-\frac{1}{2}}\\
&=\left[ \frac{c^2(1+2\frac{\mathbf v \cdot \mathbf u'}{c^2} + \frac{(\mathbf v \cdot \mathbf u')^2}{c^4}) - v^2 - u'^2 - 2(\mathbf v \cdot \mathbf u') + \frac{1}{c^2}(v^2u'^2 - (\mathbf v \cdot \mathbf u')^2)}{c^2(1+\frac{\mathbf v \cdot \mathbf u'}{c^2})^2}
\right]^{-\frac{1}{2}}\\
&=\left[ \frac{1+2\frac{\mathbf v \cdot \mathbf u'}{c^2} + \frac{(\mathbf v \cdot \mathbf u')^2}{c^4} - \frac{v^2}{c^2} - \frac{u'^2}{c^2} - \frac{2}{c^2}(\mathbf v \cdot \mathbf u') + \frac{1}{c^4}(v^2u'^2 - (\mathbf v \cdot \mathbf u')^2)}{(1+\frac{\mathbf v \cdot \mathbf u'}{c^2})^2}
\right]^{-\frac{1}{2}}\\
&=\left[ \frac{1 + \frac{(\mathbf v \cdot \mathbf u')^2}{c^4} - \frac{v^2}{c^2} - \frac{u'^2}{c^2} + \frac{1}{c^4}(v^2u'^2 - (\mathbf v \cdot \mathbf u')^2)}{(1+\frac{\mathbf v \cdot \mathbf u'}{c^2})^2}
\right]^{-\frac{1}{2}}\\
&=\left[ \frac{\left(1-\frac{v^2}{c^2}\right)\left(1-\frac{u'^2}{c^2}\right)}{\left(1+\frac{\mathbf v \cdot \mathbf u'}{c^2}\right)^2}
\right]^{-\frac{1}{2}}
=\left[ \frac{1}{\gamma_v^2\gamma_u'^2\left(1+\frac{\mathbf v \cdot \mathbf u'}{c^2}\right)^2}
\right]^{-\frac{1}{2}}\\
&=\gamma_v\gamma_u' \left(1+\frac{\mathbf v \cdot \mathbf u'}{c^2}\right)
\end{align}$$

Reverse formula found by using standard procedure of swapping v for −v and u for u′.

=== Notational conventions ===
Notations and conventions for the velocity addition vary from author to author. Different symbols may be used for the operation, or for the velocities involved, and the operands may be switched for the same expression, or the symbols may be switched for the same velocity. A completely separate symbol may also be used for the transformed velocity, rather than the prime used here. Since the velocity addition is non-commutative, one cannot switch the operands or symbols without changing the result.

Examples of alternative notation include:

No specific operand
Landau & Lifshitz (2002) (using units where c = 1)
$$| \mathbf{v_{rel}} |^2 =\frac{1}{(1 - \mathbf{v_1}\cdot\mathbf{v_2})^2}\left[(\mathbf{v_1}-\mathbf{v_2})^2 - (\mathbf{v_1} \times \mathbf{v_2})^2\right]$$
Left-to-right ordering of operands
Mocanu (1992)
$$\mathbf{u}\oplus\mathbf{v} = \frac{1}{1+\frac{\mathbf{u}\cdot\mathbf{v}}{c^2}}\left[\mathbf{v}+\mathbf{u}+\frac{1}{c^2}\frac{\gamma_\mathbf{u}}{\gamma_\mathbf{u}+1}\mathbf{u}\times(\mathbf{u}\times\mathbf{v})\right]$$
Ungar (1988)
$$\mathbf{u}*\mathbf{v}=\frac{1}{1+\frac{\mathbf{u}\cdot\mathbf{v}}{c^2}}\left[\mathbf{v}+\mathbf{u}+\frac{1}{c^2}\frac{\gamma_\mathbf{u}}{\gamma_\mathbf{u}+1}\mathbf{u}\times(\mathbf{u}\times\mathbf{v})\right]$$
Right-to-left ordering of operands
Sexl & Urbantke (2001)
$$\mathbf{w}\circ\mathbf{v}=\frac{1}{1+\frac{\mathbf{v}\cdot\mathbf{w}}{c^{2}}}\left[\frac{\mathbf{w}}{\gamma_\mathbf{v}}+\mathbf{v}+\frac{1}{c^{2}}\frac{\gamma_\mathbf{v}}{\gamma_\mathbf{v}+1}(\mathbf{w}\cdot\mathbf{v})\mathbf{v}\right]$$

== Applications ==
Some classical applications of velocity-addition formulas, to the Doppler shift, to the aberration of light, and to the dragging of light in moving water, yielding relativistically valid expressions for these phenomena are detailed below. It is also possible to use the velocity addition formula, assuming conservation of momentum (by appeal to ordinary rotational invariance), the correct form of the 3-vector part of the momentum four-vector, without resort to electromagnetism, or a priori not known to be valid, relativistic versions of the Lagrangian formalism. This involves experimentalist bouncing off relativistic billiard balls from each other. This is not detailed here, but see for reference Lewis & Tolman (1909) Wikisource version (primary source) and Sard (1970, Section 3.2).

=== Fizeau experiment ===
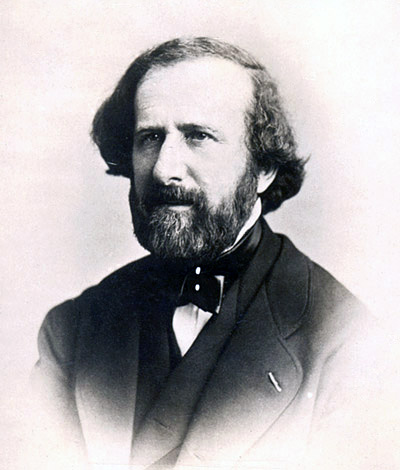
Hippolyte Fizeau (1819–1896), a French physicist, was in 1851 the first to measure the speed of light in flowing water.

When light propagates in a medium, its speed is reduced, in the rest frame of the medium, to c_{m} = c/n_{m}, where n_{m} is the index of refraction of the medium m. The speed of light in a medium uniformly moving with speed V in the positive x-direction as measured in the lab frame is given directly by the velocity addition formulas. For the forward direction (standard configuration, drop index m on n) one gets,
$$\begin{align}
c_m &= \frac{V + c_m'}{1 + \frac{Vc_m'}{c^2}} = \frac{V + \frac{c}{n}}{1 + \frac{Vc}{nc^2}} = \frac{c}{n} \frac{1 + \frac{nV}{c}}{1 + \frac{V}{nc}}\\
& =    \frac{c}{n} \left(1 + \frac{nV}{c}\right) \frac{1}{1 + \frac{V}{nc}} =
\left(\frac{c}{n} + V\right) \left(1 - \frac{V}{nc} + \left(\frac{V}{nc}\right)^2 - \cdots\right).
\end{align}$$

Collecting the largest contributions explicitly,
$$c_m = \frac{c}{n} + V\left(1 - \frac{1}{n^2} - \frac{V}{nc} + \cdots\right).$$
Fizeau found the first three terms. The classical result is the first two terms.

=== Aberration of light ===
Another basic application is to consider the deviation of light, i.e. change of its direction, when transforming to a new reference frame with parallel axes, called aberration of light. In this case, v′ = v = c, and insertion in the formula for tan θ yields
$$\tan \theta = \frac{\sqrt{1-\frac{V^2}{c^2}}c\sin \theta'}{c\cos \theta' + V}
= \frac{\sqrt{1-\frac{V^2}{c^2}}\sin \theta'}{\cos \theta' + \frac{V}{c}}.$$

For this case one may also compute sin θ and cos θ from the standard formulae,
$$\sin \theta =\frac{\sqrt{1-\frac{V^2}{c^2}}\sin \theta'}{1+\frac{V}{c}\cos \theta'},$$

Trigonometry

$$\begin{align}\frac{v_y}{v}
&= \frac{\frac{\sqrt{1-\frac{V^2}{c^2}}v_y'}{1 + \frac{V}{c^2}v_x'}}{\frac{\sqrt{v'^2 +V^2+2Vv'\cos \theta' - (\frac{Vv'\sin\theta'}{c})^2}}{1 + \frac{V}{c^2}v'\cos \theta'}}\\
&= \frac{c\sqrt{1-\frac{V^2}{c^2}}\sin \theta'}{\sqrt{c^2 +V^2+2Vc\cos \theta' - V^2\sin^2\theta'}}\\
&= \frac{c\sqrt{1-\frac{V^2}{c^2}}\sin \theta'}{\sqrt{c^2 +V^2+2Vc\cos \theta' - V^2(1 - \cos^2\theta')}}
= \frac{c\sqrt{1-\frac{V^2}{c^2}}\sin \theta'}{\sqrt{c^2 +2Vc\cos \theta' + V^2\cos^2\theta'}}\\
&= \frac{\sqrt{1-\frac{V^2}{c^2}}\sin \theta'}{1+\frac{V}{c}\cos \theta'},
\end{align}$$

$$\cos \theta = \frac{\frac{V}{c} + \cos \theta'}{1+\frac{V}{c}\cos \theta'},$$

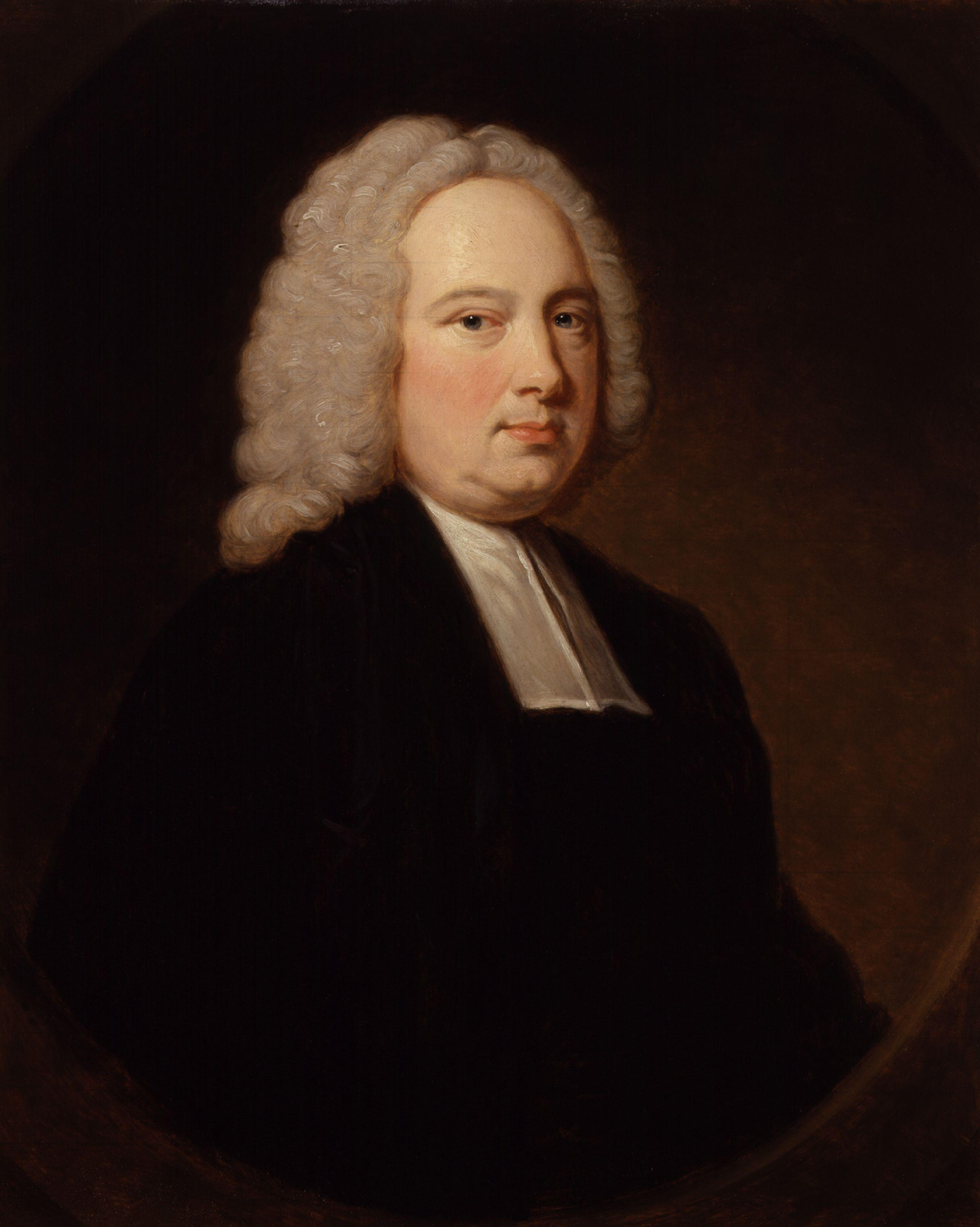
James Bradley (1693–1762) FRS provided an explanation of aberration of light correct at the classical level, at odds with the later theories prevailing in the nineteenth century based on the existence of aether.

the trigonometric manipulations essentially being identical in the cos case to the manipulations in the sin case. Consider the difference,

$$\begin{align}\sin \theta - \sin \theta' &= \sin \theta'\left(\frac{\sqrt{1 - \frac{V^2}{c^2}}}{1 + \frac{V}{c} \cos \theta'} - 1\right)\\
&\approx \sin \theta'\left(1 -\frac{V}{c} \cos \theta' - 1\right) = -\frac{V}{c}\sin\theta'\cos\theta',\end{align}$$
correct to order v/c. Employ in order to make small angle approximations a trigonometric formula,
$$\sin \theta' - \sin \theta = 2\sin \frac{1}{2}(\theta'-\theta)\cos\frac{1}{2}(\theta + \theta') \approx (\theta' - \theta)\cos\theta',$$
where cos1/2(θ + θ′) ≈ cos θ′, sin1/2(θ − θ′) ≈ 1/2(θ − θ′) were used.

Thus the quantity
$$\Delta \theta \equiv \theta' - \theta = \frac{V}{c}\sin \theta',$$
the classical aberration angle, is obtained in the limit V/c → 0.

=== Relativistic Doppler shift ===
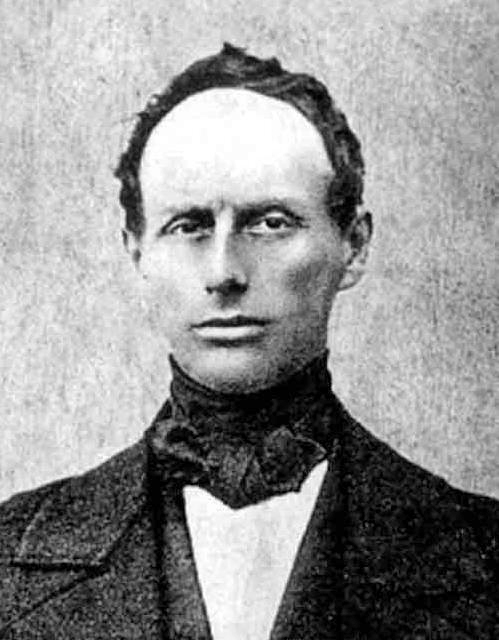
Christian Doppler (1803–1853) was an Austrian mathematician and physicist who discovered that the observed frequency of a wave depends on the relative speed of the source and the observer.

Here velocity components will be used as opposed to speed for greater generality, and in order to avoid perhaps seemingly ad hoc introductions of minus signs. Minus signs occurring here will instead serve to illuminate features when speeds less than that of light are considered.

For light waves in vacuum, time dilation together with a simple geometrical observation alone suffices to calculate the Doppler shift in standard configuration (collinear relative velocity of emitter and observer as well of observed light wave).

All velocities in what follows are parallel to the common positive x-direction, so subscripts on velocity components are dropped. In the observers frame, introduce the geometrical observation
$$\lambda = -sT + VT = (-s + V)T$$
as the spatial distance, or wavelength, between two pulses (wave crests), where T is the time elapsed between the emission of two pulses. The time elapsed between the passage of two pulses at the same point in space is the time period τ, and its inverse ν = 1/τ is the observed (temporal) frequency. The corresponding quantities in the emitters frame are endowed with primes.

For light waves
$$s = s' = -c,$$
and the observed frequency is
$$\nu = {-s \over \lambda} = {-s \over (V-s)T} = {c \over (V+c)\gamma_{_V} T'}
= \nu'\frac{c\sqrt{1 - {V^2 \over c^2}}}{c+V} = \nu'\sqrt{\frac{1-\beta}{1+\beta}}\,.$$
where T = γ_{V}T′ is standard time dilation formula.

Suppose instead that the wave is not composed of light waves with speed c, but instead, for easy visualization, bullets fired from a relativistic machine gun, with velocity s′ in the frame of the emitter. Then, in general, the geometrical observation is precisely the same. But now, s′ ≠ s, and s is given by velocity addition,
$$s = \frac{s' + V}{1+{s'V\over c^2}}.$$

The calculation is then essentially the same, except that here it is easier carried out upside down with τ = 1/ν instead of ν. One finds

$\tau= {1 \over \gamma_{_V}\nu'}\left(\frac{1}{1+{V\over s'}}\right), \quad \nu = \gamma_{_V}\nu'\left(1+{V\over s'}\right)$

Details in derivation

$$\begin{align}{L\over -s} &= \frac{\left(\frac{-s'-V}{1+{s'V\over c^2}} + V\right) T} {\frac{-s'-V}{1+{s'V\over c^2}}}\\
&={\gamma_{_V} \over \nu'}\frac{-s'-V + V(1+{s'V\over c^2})}{-s'-V}\\
&={\gamma_{_V} \over \nu'}\left(\frac{s'\left(1-{V^2\over c^2}\right)}{s'+V}\right)\\
&={\gamma_{_V} \over \nu'}\left(\frac{s'\gamma^{-2}}{s'+V}\right)\\
&={1 \over \gamma_{_V}\nu'}\left(\frac{1}{1+{V\over s'}}\right).\\
\end{align}$$

Observe that in the typical case, the s′ that enters is negative. The formula has general validity though. (Note: Note that s′ is negative in the sense for which that the problem is set up, i.e. emitter with positive velocity fires fast bullets towards observer in unprimed system. The convention is that −s > V should yield positive frequency in accordance with the result for the ultimate velocity, s = −c. Hence the minus sign is a convention, but a very natural convention, to the point of being canonical. The formula may also result in negative frequencies. The interpretation then is that the bullets are approaching from the negative x-axis. This may have two causes. The emitter can have large positive velocity and be firing slow bullets. It can also be the case that the emitter has small negative velocity and is firing fast bullets. But if the emitter has a large negative velocity and is firing slow bullets, the frequency is again positive. For some of these combination to make sense, it must be required that the emitter has been firing bullets for sufficiently long time, in the limit that the x-axis at any instant has equally spaced bullets everywhere.) When s′ = −c, the formula reduces to the formula calculated directly for light waves above,

$$\nu = \nu'\gamma_{_V}(1-\beta) = \nu'\frac{1-\beta}{\sqrt{1-\beta}\sqrt{1+\beta}}=\nu'\sqrt{\frac{1-\beta}{1+\beta}}\,.$$

If the emitter is not firing bullets in empty space, but emitting waves in a medium, then the formula still applies, but now, it may be necessary to first calculate s′ from the velocity of the emitter relative to the medium.

Returning to the case of a light emitter, in the case the observer and emitter are not collinear, the result has little modification,
$$\nu = \gamma_{_V}\nu' \left(1+\frac{V}{s'}\cos\theta\right),$$
where θ is the angle between the light emitter and the observer. This reduces to the previous result for collinear motion when θ = 0, but for transverse motion corresponding to θ = π/2, the frequency is shifted by the Lorentz factor. This does not happen in the classical optical Doppler effect.

== Hyperbolic geometry ==
The functions sinh, cosh and tanh. The function tanh relates the rapidity −∞ < ς < +∞ to relativistic velocity −1 < β < +1.

Associated to the relativistic velocity $\boldsymbol \beta$ of an object is a quantity $\boldsymbol{\zeta}$ whose norm is called rapidity. These are related through
$$\mathfrak{so}(3,1) \supset \mathrm{span}\{K_1, K_2, K_3\} \approx \mathbb{R}^3 \ni \boldsymbol{\zeta} = \boldsymbol{\hat{\beta}} \tanh^{-1}\beta, \quad \boldsymbol{\beta} \in \mathbb{B}^3,$$
where the vector $\boldsymbol \zeta$ is thought of as being Cartesian coordinates on a 3-dimensional subspace of the Lie algebra $\mathfrak{so}(3, 1)$ of the Lorentz group spanned by the boost generators $K_1, K_2, K_3$. This space, call it rapidity space, is isomorphic to ℝ^{3} as a vector space, and is mapped to the open unit ball, $\mathbb B^3$, velocity space, via the above relation. The addition law on collinear form coincides with the law of addition of hyperbolic tangents
$$\tanh(\zeta_v + \zeta_{u'}) = {\tanh \zeta_v + \tanh \zeta_{u'} \over 1+ \tanh \zeta_v \tanh \zeta_{u'}}$$
with
$$\frac{v}{c} = \tanh \zeta_v \ , \quad \frac{u'}{c} = \tanh \zeta_{u'} \ , \quad\, \frac{u}{c} = \tanh(\zeta_v + \zeta_{u'}).$$

The line element in velocity space $\mathbb B^3$ follows from the expression for relativistic relative velocity in any frame,
$$v_{r} = \frac{\sqrt{(\mathbf{v_1}-\mathbf{v_2})^2 - (\mathbf{v_1} \times \mathbf{v_2})^2}}{1 - \mathbf{v_1}\cdot\mathbf{v_2}},$$
where the speed of light is set to unity so that $v_i$ and $\beta_i$ agree. It this expression, $\mathbf{v}_1$ and $\mathbf{v}_2$ are velocities of two objects in any one given frame. The quantity $v_r$ is the speed of one or the other object relative to the other object as seen in the given frame. The expression is Lorentz invariant, i.e. independent of which frame is the given frame, but the quantity it calculates is not. For instance, if the given frame is the rest frame of object one, then $v_r = v_2$.

The line element is found by putting $\mathbf v_2 = \mathbf v_1 + d\mathbf v$ or equivalently $\boldsymbol \beta_2 = \boldsymbol \beta_1 + d\boldsymbol \beta$,
$$dl_\boldsymbol{\beta}^2 = \frac{d\boldsymbol \beta^2 - (\boldsymbol \beta \times d\boldsymbol \beta)^2}{(1-\beta^2)^2} = \frac{d\beta^2}{(1-\beta^2)^2} + \frac{\beta^2}{1-\beta^2}(d\theta^2 + \sin^2\theta d\varphi^2),$$
with θ and φ the usual spherical angle coordinates for $\boldsymbol \beta$ taken in the z-direction. Now introduce ζ through
$$\zeta = |\boldsymbol \zeta| = \tanh^{-1}\beta,$$
and the line element on rapidity space $\mathbb R^3$ becomes
$$dl_{\boldsymbol \zeta}^2 = d\zeta^2 + \sinh^2\zeta(d\theta^2 + \sin^2\theta d\varphi^2).$$

=== Relativistic particle collisions ===
In scattering experiments the primary objective is to measure the invariant scattering cross section. This enters the formula for scattering of two particle types into a final state $f$ assumed to have two or more particles,
$$dN_f = R_f \, dV \, dt = \sigma F \, dV \, dt$$
or, in most textbooks,
$$dN_f = \sigma n_1 n_2 v_r \, dV \, dt$$
where

- $dVdt$ is spacetime volume. It is an invariant under Lorentz transformations.
- $dN_f$ is the total number of reactions resulting in final state $f$ in spacetime volume $dVdt$. Being a number, it is invariant when the same spacetime volume is considered.
- $R_f = F\sigma$ is the number of reactions resulting in final state $f$ per unit spacetime, or reaction rate. This is invariant.
- $F = n_1n_2v_{r}$ is called the incident flux. This is required to be invariant, but isn't in the most general setting.
- $\sigma$ is the scattering cross section. It is required to be invariant.
- $n_1, n_2$ are the particle densities in the incident beams. These are not invariant as is clear due to length contraction.
- $v_{r} = |\mathbf v_2 - \mathbf v_1|$ is the relative speed of the two incident beams. This cannot be invariant since $F = n_1n_2v_{r}$ is required to be so.

The objective is to find a correct expression for relativistic relative speed $v_\text{rel}$ and an invariant expression for the incident flux.

Non-relativistically, one has for relative speed $v_r = |\mathbf v_2 - \mathbf v_1|$. If the system in which velocities are measured is the rest frame of particle type $1$, it is required that $v_\text{rel} = v_r = |\mathbf v_2|.$ Setting the speed of light $c = 1$, the expression for $v_\text{rel}$ follows immediately from the formula for the norm (second formula) in the general configuration as
$$v_\text{rel} =\frac{\sqrt{(\mathbf{v_1}-\mathbf{v_2})^2 - (\mathbf{v_1} \times \mathbf{v_2})^2}}{1 - \mathbf{v_1}\cdot\mathbf{v_2}}.$$

The formula reduces in the classical limit to $v_r = |\mathbf v_1 - \mathbf v_2|$ as it should, and gives the correct result in the rest frames of the particles. The relative velocity is incorrectly given in most, perhaps all books on particle physics and quantum field theory. This is mostly harmless, since if either one particle type is stationary or the relative motion is collinear, then the right result is obtained from the incorrect formulas. The formula is invariant, but not manifestly so. It can be rewritten in terms of four-velocities as
$$v_\text{rel} = \frac{\sqrt{(u_1 \cdot u_2)^2 - 1}}{u_1 \cdot u_2}.$$

The correct expression for the flux, published by Christian Møller in 1945, is given by
$$F = n_1n_2\sqrt{(\mathbf v_1 - \mathbf v_2)^2 - (\mathbf v_1 \times \mathbf v_2)^2} \equiv n_1n_2\bar v.$$

One notes that for collinear velocities, $F = n_1n_2|\mathbf v_2 - \mathbf v_1| = n_1n_2v_r$. In order to get a manifestly Lorentz invariant expression one writes $J_i = (n_i, n_i\mathbf v_i)$ with $n_i = \gamma_i n_i^0$, where $n_i^0$ is the density in the rest frame, for the individual particle fluxes and arrives at
$$F = (J_1 \cdot J_2) v_\text{rel}.$$

In the literature the quantity $\bar v$ as well as $v_r$ are both referred to as the relative velocity. In some cases (statistical physics and dark matter literature), $\bar v$ is referred to as the Møller velocity, in which case $v_r$ means relative velocity. The true relative velocity is at any rate $v_\text{rel}$. The discrepancy between $v_\text{rel}$ and $v_r$ is relevant though in most cases velocities are collinear. At LHC the crossing angle is small, around 300 μrad, but at the old Intersecting Storage Ring at CERN, it was about 18°.

== With rapidity ==
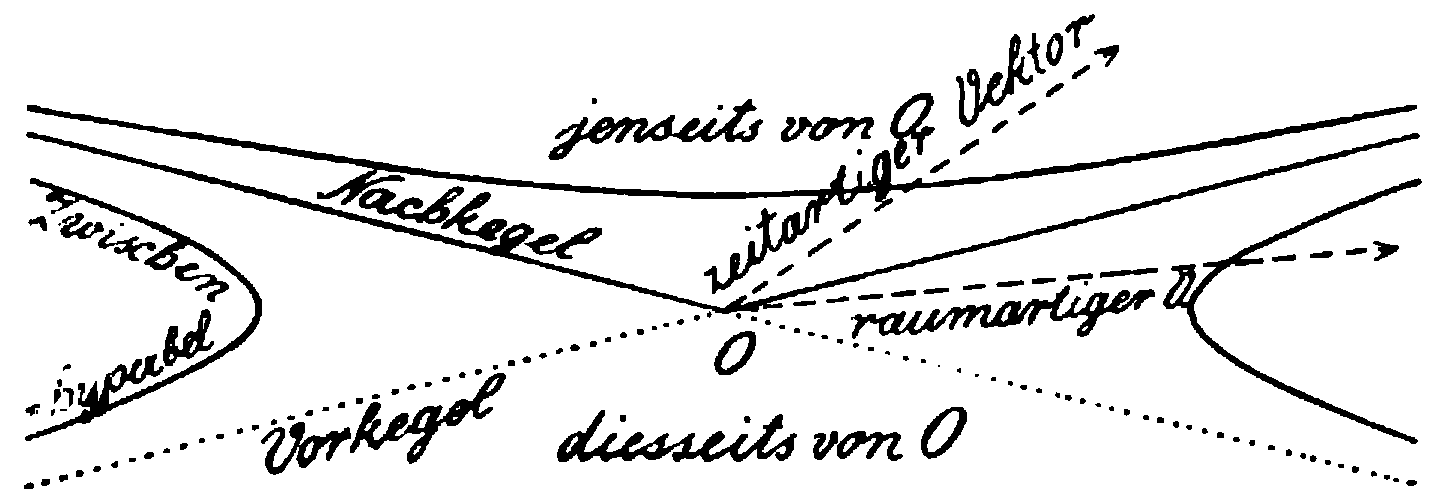
Light cone and conjugate hyperbolas in Minkowski (1908)

For collinear velocities interpreted as rapidity, the sum formula is simple addition. According to Minkowski, the time-like vector (zeitartiger Vektor) for a given duration lies on a hyperbola. Since the hyperbola is traced by a hyperbolic angle, and velocity determines a point on the hyperbola, there is a hyperbolic angle called rapidity associated with a particular velocity. For a unit of duration, the unit hyperbola provides a reference, where hyperbolic angle forms a one-parameter group isomorphic to the real number line under addition. The form of the formula for velocity addition can then be accounted in terms of the hyperbolic tangent function tanh which takes hyperbolic angle (rapidity) as an argument. In fact, the hyperbolic tangent of rapidity is the ratio of velocity to the speed of light in vacuum.

== See also ==
- Hyperbolic law of cosines
- Biquaternion
- Relative velocity
