= Thomas precession =

Relativistic correction

In physics, the Thomas precession, named after Llewellyn Thomas, is a relativistic correction that applies to the spin of an elementary particle or the rotation of a macroscopic gyroscope. It relates the angular velocity of the spin of a particle following a curvilinear orbit to the angular velocity of the orbital motion.

For a given inertial frame, if a second frame is Lorentz-boosted relative to it, and a third boosted relative to the second, but non-colinear with the first boost, then the Lorentz transformation between the first and third frames involves a combined boost and rotation, known as the "Wigner rotation" or "Thomas rotation". For accelerated motion, the accelerated frame has an inertial frame at every instant. Two boosts a small time interval (as measured in the lab frame) apart leads to a Wigner rotation after the second boost. In the limit the time interval tends to zero, the accelerated frame will rotate at every instant, so the accelerated frame rotates with an angular velocity.

Geometrically the precession can be understood as a consequence of the hyperbolic nature of the space of velocities in relativity, where parallel transport of a vector (the gyroscope's angular velocity) around a circle (its linear velocity) leaves it pointing in a different direction. Algebraically it can be understood as a result of the non-commutativity of Lorentz transformations. Thomas precession gives a correction to the spin–orbit interaction in quantum mechanics, which takes into account the relativistic time dilation between the electron and the nucleus of an atom.

Thomas precession is a kinematic effect in the flat spacetime of special relativity. In the curved spacetime of general relativity, Thomas precession combines with a geometric effect to produce de Sitter precession. Although Thomas precession (net rotation after a trajectory that returns to its initial velocity) is a purely kinematic effect, it only occurs in curvilinear motion and therefore cannot be observed independently of some external force causing the curvilinear motion such as that caused by an electromagnetic field, a gravitational field or a mechanical force, so Thomas precession is usually accompanied by dynamical effects.

If the system experiences no external torque, e.g., in external scalar fields, its spin dynamics are determined only by the Thomas precession. A single discrete Thomas rotation (as opposed to the series of infinitesimal rotations that add up to the Thomas precession) is present in situations anytime there are three or more inertial frames in non-collinear motion, as can be seen using Lorentz transformations.

== History ==
Thomas precession in relativity was known to Ludwik Silberstein in 1914. In 1925 Thomas recomputed the relativistic precessional frequency of the doublet separation in the fine structure of the atom. He thus found the missing factor 1/2, which came to be known as the Thomas half. But the only knowledge Thomas had of relativistic precession came from de Sitter's paper on the relativistic precession of the moon, first published in a book by Eddington.

This discovery of the relativistic precession of the electron spin led to the understanding of the significance of the relativistic effect. The effect was consequently named "Thomas precession".

== Introduction ==
=== Definition ===
Consider a physical system moving through Minkowski spacetime. Assume that there is at any moment an inertial system such that in it, the system is at rest. This assumption is sometimes called an additional postulate of relativity. This means that at any instant, the coordinates and state of the system can be Lorentz transformed to the lab system through some Lorentz transformation.

Let the system be subject to external forces that produce no torque with respect to its center of mass in its (instantaneous) rest frame. The condition of "no torque" is necessary to isolate the phenomenon of Thomas precession. As a simplifying assumption one assumes that the external forces bring the system back to its initial velocity after some finite time. Fix a Lorentz frame O such that the initial and final velocities are zero.

The Pauli–Lubanski spin vector S_{μ} is defined to be (0, S_{i}) in the system's rest frame, with S_{i} the angular-momentum three-vector about the center of mass. In the motion from initial to final position, S_{μ} undergoes a rotation, as recorded in O, from its initial to its final value. This continuous change is the Thomas precession.

=== Statement ===
Value of γ^{2}/(γ + 1) as β = v/c increases, with v the instantaneous magnitude of the particle's velocity. The Thomas rotation is negligible for β < 0.5, increases steadily for 0.5 < β < 0.8, then rapidly shoots to infinity as β tends to 1. The "Thomas half" is evident in the low-speed limit, and the rotation is only very clear for speeds approaching that of light.

Consider the motion of a particle. Introduce a lab frame Σ in which an observer can measure the relative motion of the particle. At each instant of time the particle has an inertial frame in which it is at rest. Relative to this lab frame, the instantaneous velocity of the particle is v(t) with magnitude |v| = v bounded by the speed of light c, so that 0 ≤ v < c. Here the time t is the coordinate time as measured in the lab frame, not the proper time of the particle.

Apart from the upper limit on magnitude, the velocity of the particle is arbitrary and not necessarily constant; its corresponding vector of acceleration is a = dv(t)/dt. As a result of the Wigner rotation at every instant, the particle's frame precesses with an angular velocity given by the equation

Thomas precession

$\boldsymbol{\omega}_\text{T} = \frac{1}{c^2}\left(\frac{\gamma^2}{\gamma+1}\right)\mathbf{a}\times\mathbf{v}$

where × is the cross product and

$$\gamma = \dfrac{1}{\sqrt{1-\dfrac{|\mathbf{v}(t)|^2}{c^2}}}$$

is the instantaneous Lorentz factor, a function of the particle's instantaneous velocity. Like any angular velocity, ω_{T} is a pseudovector; its magnitude is the angular speed the particle's frame precesses (in radians per second), and the direction points along the rotation axis. As is usual, the right-hand convention of the cross product is used (see right-hand rule).

The precession depends on accelerated motion, and the non-collinearity of the particle's instantaneous velocity and acceleration. No precession occurs if the particle moves with uniform velocity (constant v so a = 0), or accelerates in a straight line (in which case v and a are parallel or antiparallel so their cross product is zero). The particle has to move in a curve, say an arc, spiral, helix, or a circular orbit or elliptical orbit, for its frame to precess. The angular velocity of the precession is a maximum if the velocity and acceleration vectors are perpendicular throughout the motion (a circular orbit), and is large if their magnitudes are large (the magnitude of v is almost c).

In the non-relativistic limit, v → 0 so γ → 1, and the angular velocity is approximately

$$\boldsymbol{\omega}_\text{T} \approx \frac{1}{2c^2}\mathbf{a}\times\mathbf{v}$$

The factor of 1/2 turns out to be the critical factor to agree with experimental results. It is informally known as the "Thomas half".

== Mathematical explanation ==
=== Lorentz transformations ===
The description of relative motion involves Lorentz transformations, and it is convenient to use them in matrix form; symbolic matrix expressions summarize the transformations and are easy to manipulate, and when required the full matrices can be written explicitly. Also, to prevent extra factors of c cluttering the equations, it is convenient to use the definition β(t) = v(t)/c with magnitude |β| = β such that 0 ≤ β < 1.

The spacetime coordinates of the lab frame are collected into a 4×1 column vector, and the boost is represented as a 4×4 symmetric matrix, respectively

$$X = \begin{bmatrix} c t \\ x \\ y \\ z \end{bmatrix}\,,\quad B(\boldsymbol{\beta}) =
\begin{bmatrix} \gamma&-\gamma\beta_x &-\gamma\beta_y&-\gamma\beta_z\\
-\gamma\beta_x &1+(\gamma-1)\dfrac{\beta_x^2}{\beta^2} &(\gamma-1)\dfrac{\beta_x \beta_y}{\beta^2} &(\gamma-1)\dfrac{\beta_x \beta_z}{\beta^2} \\
-\gamma\beta_y &(\gamma-1)\dfrac{\beta_y \beta_x}{\beta^2} &1+(\gamma-1)\dfrac{\beta_y^2}{\beta^2} &(\gamma-1)\dfrac{\beta_y \beta_z}{\beta^2} \\
-\gamma\beta_z&(\gamma-1)\dfrac{\beta_z \beta_x}{\beta^2} &(\gamma-1)\dfrac{\beta_z \beta_y}{\beta^2} & 1+(\gamma-1)\dfrac{\beta_z^2}{\beta^2} \\ \end{bmatrix}$$

and turn

$$\gamma = \frac{1}{\sqrt{1-|\boldsymbol{\beta}|^2}}$$

is the Lorentz factor of β. In other frames, the corresponding coordinates are also arranged into column vectors. The inverse matrix of the boost corresponds to a boost in the opposite direction, and is given by B(β)^{−1} = B(−β).

At an instant of lab-recorded time t measured in the lab frame, the transformation of spacetime coordinates from the lab frame Σ to the particle's frame Σ′ is

$X' = B(\boldsymbol{\beta})X$	1

and at later lab-recorded time t + Δt we can define a new frame Σ′′ for the particle, which moves with velocity β + Δβ relative to Σ, and the corresponding boost is

$X'' = B(\boldsymbol{\beta} + \Delta\boldsymbol{\beta})X$	2

The vectors β and Δβ are two separate vectors. The latter is a small increment, and can be conveniently split into components parallel (‖) and perpendicular (⊥) to β (Note: Explicitly, using vector projection and rejection relative to the direction of β gives $$\Delta\boldsymbol{\beta}_\parallel = \frac{\Delta\boldsymbol{\beta}\cdot\boldsymbol{\beta}}{\beta^2}\boldsymbol{\beta}\,,\quad \Delta\boldsymbol{\beta}_\perp = \Delta\boldsymbol{\beta} - \frac{\Delta\boldsymbol{\beta}\cdot\boldsymbol{\beta}}{\beta^2}\boldsymbol{\beta}$$ but it is easier to simply use the parallel-perpendicular components.)

$$\Delta\boldsymbol{\beta} = \Delta\boldsymbol{\beta}_\parallel + \Delta\boldsymbol{\beta}_\perp$$

Combining (1) and (2) obtains the Lorentz transformation between Σ′ and Σ′′,

$X'' = B(\boldsymbol{\beta} + \Delta\boldsymbol{\beta})B(-\boldsymbol{\beta})X' \,,$	3

and this composition contains all the required information about the motion between these two lab times. Notice B(β + Δβ)B(−β) and B(β + Δβ) are infinitesimal transformations because they involve a small increment in the relative velocity, while B(−β) is not.

The composition of two boosts equates to a single boost combined with a Wigner rotation about an axis perpendicular to the relative velocities;

$\Lambda = B(\boldsymbol{\beta} + \Delta\boldsymbol{\beta})B(-\boldsymbol{\beta}) = R(\Delta\boldsymbol{\theta})B(\Delta\mathbf{b})$	4

The rotation is given by a 4×4 rotation matrix R in the axis–angle representation, and coordinate systems are taken to be right-handed. This matrix rotates 3d vectors anticlockwise about an axis (active transformation), or equivalently rotates coordinate frames clockwise about the same axis (passive transformation). The axis-angle vector Δθ parametrizes the rotation, its magnitude Δθ is the angle Σ′′ has rotated, and its direction is parallel to the rotation axis. In this case the axis is parallel to the cross product (−β)×(β + Δβ) = −β×Δβ. If the angles are negative, then the sense of rotation is reversed. The inverse matrix is given by R(Δθ)^{−1} = R(−Δθ).

Corresponding to the boost is the (small change in the) boost vector Δb, with magnitude and direction of the relative velocity of the boost (divided by c). The boost B(Δb) and rotation R(Δθ) here are infinitesimal transformations because Δb and rotation Δθ are small.

The rotation gives rise to the Thomas precession, but there is a subtlety. To interpret the particle's frame as a co-moving inertial frame relative to the lab frame, and agree with the non-relativistic limit, we expect the transformation between the particle's instantaneous frames at times t and t + Δt to be related by a boost without rotation. Combining (3) and (4) and rearranging gives

$B(\Delta\mathbf{b})X' = R(-\Delta\boldsymbol{\theta}) X'' = X''' \,,$	5

where another instantaneous frame Σ′′′ is introduced with coordinates X′′′, to prevent conflation with Σ′′. To summarize the frames of reference: in the lab frame Σ an observer measures the motion of the particle, and three instantaneous inertial frames in which the particle is at rest are Σ′ (at time t), Σ′′ (at time t + Δt), and Σ′′′ (at time t + Δt). The frames Σ′′ and Σ′′′ are at the same location and time, they differ only by a rotation. By contrast Σ′ and Σ′′′ differ by a boost and lab time interval Δt.

Relating the coordinates X′′′ to the lab coordinates X via (5) and (2);

$X''' = R(-\Delta\boldsymbol{\theta}) X'' = R(-\Delta\boldsymbol{\theta}) B(\boldsymbol{\beta} + \Delta\boldsymbol{\beta}) X \,,$	6

the frame Σ′′′ is rotated in the negative sense.

The rotation is between two instants of lab time. As Δt → 0, the particle's frame rotates at every instant, and the continuous motion of the particle amounts to a continuous rotation with an angular velocity at every instant. Dividing −Δθ by Δt, and taking the limit Δt → 0, the angular velocity is by definition

$\boldsymbol{\omega}_T = -\lim_{\Delta t \rightarrow 0 }\frac{\Delta\boldsymbol{\theta}}{\Delta t}$	7

It remains to find what Δθ precisely is.

=== Extracting the formula ===
The composition can be obtained by explicitly calculating the matrix product. The boost matrix of β + Δβ will require the magnitude and Lorentz factor of this vector. Since Δβ is small, terms of "second order" |Δβ|^{2}, (Δβ_{x})^{2}, (Δβ_{y})^{2}, Δβ_{x}Δβ_{y} and higher are negligible. Taking advantage of this fact, the magnitude squared of the vector is

$$|\boldsymbol{\beta}+\Delta\boldsymbol{\beta}|^2=|\boldsymbol{\beta}|^2+2\boldsymbol{\beta}\cdot\Delta\boldsymbol{\beta}$$

and expanding the Lorentz factor of β + Δβ as a power series gives to first order in Δβ,

$$\begin{align}\frac{1}{\sqrt{1-|\boldsymbol{\beta}+\Delta\boldsymbol{\beta}|^2}} & =1+\frac{1}{2}|\boldsymbol{\beta}+\Delta\boldsymbol{\beta}|^2+\frac{3}{8}|\boldsymbol{\beta}+\Delta\boldsymbol{\beta}|^4+\cdots \\
& = \left(1+\frac{|\boldsymbol{\beta}|^2}2+\frac{3}{8}|\boldsymbol{\beta}|^4+\cdots\right)+\left(1+\frac{3}2|\boldsymbol{\beta}|^2+\cdots\right)\boldsymbol{\beta}\cdot\Delta\boldsymbol{\beta} \\
& \approx \gamma + \gamma^3\boldsymbol{\beta}\cdot\Delta\boldsymbol{\beta}
\end{align}$$

using the Lorentz factor γ of β as above.

Composition of boosts in the xy plane

To simplify the calculation without loss of generality, take the direction of β to be entirely in the x direction, and Δβ in the xy plane, so the parallel component is along the x direction while the perpendicular component is along the y direction. The axis of the Wigner rotation is along the z direction. In the Cartesian basis e_{x}, e_{y}, e_{z}, a set of mutually perpendicular unit vectors in their indicated directions, we have

$$\boldsymbol{\beta} = \beta\mathbf{e}_x \,, \quad \Delta\boldsymbol{\beta}_\parallel = \Delta\beta_x\mathbf{e}_x \,, \quad \Delta\boldsymbol{\beta}_\perp = \Delta\beta_y\mathbf{e}_y \,,\quad \boldsymbol{\beta}\times\Delta\boldsymbol{\beta}= \beta\Delta\beta_y\mathbf{e}_z$$

This simplified setup allows the boost matrices to be given explicitly with the minimum number of matrix entries. In general, of course, β and Δβ can be in any plane, the final result given later will not be different.

Explicitly, at time t the boost is in the negative x direction

$$B(-\boldsymbol{\beta}) =
\begin{bmatrix} \gamma& \gamma\beta & 0 & 0 \\
\gamma\beta & \gamma & 0 & 0 \\
0 & 0 & 1 & 0 \\
0 & 0 & 0 & 1 \\
\end{bmatrix}$$

and the boost at the time t + Δt is

$$B(\boldsymbol{\beta} + \Delta\boldsymbol{\beta})=
\begin{bmatrix}
\gamma + \gamma^3 \beta \Delta \beta_x & -(\gamma\beta + \gamma^3 \Delta \beta_x) & -\gamma\Delta\beta_y & 0 \\
-(\gamma\beta + \gamma^3 \Delta \beta_x) & \gamma + \gamma^3 \beta \Delta \beta_x & \left(\dfrac{\gamma-1}{\beta}\right)\Delta\beta_y & 0 \\
-\gamma\Delta\beta_y & \left(\dfrac{\gamma-1}{\beta}\right)\Delta\beta_y & 1 & 0 \\
0 & 0 & 0 & 1
\end{bmatrix}$$

where γ is the Lorentz factor of β, not β + Δβ. The composite transformation is then the matrix product

$$\Lambda = B(\boldsymbol{\beta} + \Delta\boldsymbol{\beta})B(-\boldsymbol{\beta})=
\begin{bmatrix}
1 & -\gamma^2 \Delta \beta_x & -\gamma\Delta\beta_y & 0 \\
-\gamma^2 \Delta \beta_x & 1 & \left(\dfrac{\gamma-1}{\beta}\right)\Delta\beta_y & 0 \\
-\gamma\Delta\beta_y & - \left(\dfrac{\gamma-1}{\beta}\right)\Delta\beta_y & 1 & 0 \\
0 & 0 & 0 & 1
\end{bmatrix}$$

Introducing the boost generators

$$K_x = \begin{bmatrix} 0 &1 & 0 & 0 \\ 1 & 0 & 0 & 0 \\ 0 & 0 & 0 & 0 \\ 0 & 0 & 0 & 0 \\ \end{bmatrix}\,,\quad K_y = \begin{bmatrix}0 & 0 & 1 & 0\\ 0 & 0 & 0 & 0\\ 1 & 0 & 0 & 0\\ 0 & 0 & 0 & 0 \end{bmatrix}\,,\quad K_z = \begin{bmatrix}0 & 0 & 0 & 1\\ 0 & 0 & 0 & 0\\ 0 & 0 & 0 & 0\\ 1 & 0 & 0 & 0 \end{bmatrix}$$

and rotation generators

$$J_x = \begin{bmatrix} 0 & 0 & 0 & 0 \\ 0 & 0 & 0 & 0 \\ 0 & 0 & 0 & -1 \\ 0 & 0 & 1 & 0 \\ \end{bmatrix}\,,\quad J_y = \begin{bmatrix} 0 & 0 & 0 & 0\\ 0 & 0 & 0 & 1\\ 0 & 0 & 0 & 0\\ 0 & -1 & 0 & 0 \end{bmatrix}\,,\quad J_z = \begin{bmatrix} 0 & 0 & 0 & 0\\ 0 & 0 & -1 & 0\\ 0 & 1 & 0 & 0\\ 0 & 0 & 0 & 0 \end{bmatrix}$$

along with the dot product · facilitates the coordinate independent expression

$$\Lambda = I - \left(\frac{\gamma-1}{\beta^2}\right)(\boldsymbol{\beta}\times\Delta\boldsymbol{\beta})\cdot\mathbf{J} - \gamma(\gamma\Delta\boldsymbol{\beta}_\parallel+\Delta\boldsymbol{\beta}_\perp)\cdot\mathbf{K}$$

which holds if β and Δβ lie in any plane. This is an infinitesimal Lorentz transformation in the form of a combined boost and rotation (Note: The rotation and boost matrices (each infinitesimal) are given by $$R(\Delta\boldsymbol{\theta}) = I - \Delta\boldsymbol{\theta}\cdot\mathbf{J} \,,\quad B(\Delta\mathbf{b}) = I - \Delta\mathbf{b}\cdot\mathbf{K} \,,$$ At the infinitesimal level, they commute with each other $$\Lambda = B(\Delta\mathbf{b})R(\Delta\boldsymbol{\theta}) = R(\Delta\boldsymbol{\theta})B(\Delta\mathbf{b})$$ because the products (Δθ·J)(Δb·K) and (Δb·K)(Δθ·J) are negligible. The full boost and rotations do not commute in general.)

$$\Lambda = I - \Delta\boldsymbol{\theta}\cdot\mathbf{J} - \Delta\mathbf{b}\cdot\mathbf{K}$$

where

$$\Delta\boldsymbol{\theta} = \left(\frac{\gamma-1}{\beta^2}\right)\boldsymbol{\beta}\times\Delta\boldsymbol{\beta} = \frac{1}{c^2}\left(\frac{\gamma^2}{\gamma+1}\right)\mathbf{v}\times\Delta\mathbf{v}$$
$$\Delta\mathbf{b} = \gamma(\gamma\Delta\boldsymbol{\beta}_\parallel+\Delta\boldsymbol{\beta}_\perp)$$

After dividing Δθ by Δt and taking the limit as in (7), one obtains the instantaneous angular velocity

$$\boldsymbol{\omega}_T = \frac{1}{c^2}\left(\frac{\gamma^2}{\gamma+1}\right)\mathbf{a}\times\mathbf{v}$$

where a is the acceleration of the particle as observed in the lab frame. No forces were specified or used in the derivation so the precession is a kinematical effect - it arises from the geometric aspects of motion. However, forces cause accelerations, so the Thomas precession is observed if the particle is subject to forces.

== Derivation from the Fermi-Walker transport equation ==
Thomas precession can also be derived using the Fermi-Walker transport equation. This is most easily done for a particle with spin with CCW circular motion in the x-y plane at constant velocity v. The spin is assumed to have a component in the x-y plane that precesses. As will be shown, the spin 4-vector component $S^0$ obeys the differential equation

$$\frac{d^2}{d\, {\tau}^2}\, \,S^0\,=\,-{\gamma}^2\,{\omega}^{2\,(proper)}\,S^0$$

$\tau$ is proper time in the particle's accelerated frame and ${\omega}^{(proper)}$ is the angular velocity observed by the particle. This represents sinusoidal motion with angular velocity $\gamma\,\omega^{(proper)}$as observed by the particle. $S^0$ is most positive when the spin direction in the x-y plane is aligned with the velocity direction and most negative when the directions are oppositely aligned. Since the period between alignments is less than the orbital period, the spin precession is retrograde. The retrograde angular velocity of the precession is

$${\omega}^{(proper)}_T\,=\,(\gamma\,-\,1)\,{\omega}^{(proper)}$$

The $T$ subscript denotes Thomas precession. Since the laboratory time $t$ is a constant multiple $\gamma$ of the proper time $\tau$, this same relation holds for these angular velocities measured in the laboratory frame. Their ratio doesn't change.

This is the same formula as obtained earlier since

$$\mathbf{a} \, \times \, \mathbf{v} \,=\, -\, {\omega}^{(lab)}\,v^2 \, \mathbf{\hat{z}} \, \Rightarrow \, \frac{1}{c^2}\, \frac{{\gamma}^2}{\gamma + 1}\,\mathbf{a} \, \times \, \mathbf{v} \,=\,-(\gamma - 1)\,\omega^{lab}\,\mathbf{\hat{z}}$$

$\mathbf{\hat{z}}$ is a unit vector in the +z direction.

=== Proof of the equation for S^{0} ===
Without loss of generality, the unit of time may be chosen so that the orbital angular velocity ${\omega}^{(proper)}\,=\,1$, the origin of time chosen so that the initial motion is in the +x direction, and the unit of distance chosen so that the speed of light $c=1$.

Use the metric $g_{00}=-1$. The 4-velocity is

$$u\,=\,(\gamma,\,\gamma \, v \, \cos (\tau),\, \gamma \, v \sin (\tau),\, 0)$$

The 4-acceleration is

$$a\,=\,(0,\,-\gamma \, v \, \sin (\tau),\, \gamma \, v \cos (\tau),\, 0)$$

The time derivative of the 4-acceleration is

$$\frac{d}{d\,\tau}\,a\,=\,(0,\,-\gamma \, v \, \cos (\tau),\, -\gamma \, v \sin (\tau),\, 0)\, = \, -u\,+\,(\gamma,0,0,0)$$

The Fermi-Walker transport equation for the 4-spin S is

$$\frac{d}{d\,\tau}\,S\,=\,u\;a \cdot S\,-\,a\,\;u \cdot S\, = \, u\;a \cdot S$$

since $u \cdot S=0$. If $S$ is replaced by $u$, then, as expected, $\frac{d}{d \tau}\, u = a$ since $u \cdot a = 0$ and $u \cdot u=-1$. The Fermi-Walker transport equation for $S^0$ with this circular motion is

$$\frac{d}{d\,\tau}\,S^0\,=\, \gamma \, a \cdot S$$

Taking the time derivative of this equation and substituting for $\frac{d}{d\,\tau}\, a$ and $\frac{d}{d\,\tau}\,S$ gives the equation completing the derivation

$$\frac{d^2}{d\,{\tau}^2}\,S^0\,=\,-{\gamma}^2\,S^0$$

=== S_{x} and S_{y} from S^{0} ===
The unit vectors $e_x=(0,1,0,0)$ and $e_y=(0,0,1,0)$ are time-dependent linear combinations of $u-\gamma\,e_0$ and the 4-acceleration $a$. Here $e_0=(1,0,0,0)$. Then use

$$\begin{align}S \cdot (u-\gamma\,e_0) & = \gamma\,S^0 \\ S \cdot a & = \, \gamma ^{-1} \, \frac{d \,S^0}{d \, \tau}\end{align}$$

$e_x$ and $e_y$ are the linear combinations

$$\begin{align} e_x\, & = \,\gamma^{-1} \, v^{-1} \, (u-\gamma \, e_0)\, \cos (\tau)\, - \gamma^{-1} \, v^{-1} \, a \, \sin (\tau) \\ e_y\, & = \,\gamma^{-1} \, v^{-1} \, (u-\gamma \, e_0)\, \sin (\tau)\, + \gamma^{-1} \, v^{-1} \, a \, \cos (\tau)\end{align}$$

Substituting

$$\begin{align}S_x\,=\,S \, \cdot \, e_x\, & = \, v^{-1} \, S^0\, \cos (\tau)\, - \gamma^{-2} \, v^{-1} \, \frac{d\,S^0}{d \, \tau} \, \sin (\tau) \\ S_y\,=\,S \, \cdot \, e_y\, & = \, v^{-1} \, S^0\, \sin (\tau)\, + \gamma^{-2} \, v^{-1} \, \frac{d\,S^0}{d \, \tau} \, \cos (\tau)\end{align}$$

Classically, $S^0$ is given by

$$S^0 \, = \, |\mathbf S_{\perp}| \, \gamma \, v \, \cos(\gamma \, \tau + \phi)$$

where $|\mathbf S_{\perp}|$ is the magnitude of the spin component in the x-y plane in the rest frame. This gives

$$\begin{align} S_x \,& = \, |\mathbf S_{\perp}|\,(\sin (\tau) \sin(\gamma\,\tau+\phi)+\gamma\,\cos(\tau)\,\cos(\gamma\,\tau+\phi))\\ S_y\, & = \, |S_{\perp}| \, (-\cos(\tau)\,\sin(\gamma\,\tau+\phi) \, + \gamma \, \sin(\tau)\,\cos(\gamma \, \tau + \phi))\end{align}$$

For $\tau=0$ and $\phi=0$ the spin 4-vector is, as expected,

$$S\,=\,|\mathbf S_{\perp}|\,(\gamma\,v,\,\gamma,\,0,\,0)$$

$S^0$ is most positive when $\gamma \, \tau_n + \phi=2\,n\,\pi$ for integer n. Then

$$\begin{align} S_x \,& = \, |\mathbf S_{\perp}|\,\gamma\,\cos(\tau_n) \\ S_y \, & = \, |S_{\perp}| \, \gamma \, \sin(\tau_n)\end{align}$$

At these times, the $u_x$ and $u_y$ components of the 4-velocity are

$$\begin{align} u_x \,& = \, \gamma\,v\,\cos(\tau_n) \\ u_y \, & = \, \gamma \, v \, \sin(\tau_n)\end{align}$$

So $S^0$ is most positive when the spin and velocity directions are aligned.

These equations for $S^0,\,S_x,\,S_y$ agree with the solution for the spin 4-vector given in Exercise 6.9 in Misner, Thorne, and Wheeler if we let $|\mathbf{S_\perp}|=\hbar/\sqrt 2$ and $\phi=\pi / 2$ and if we also let $\cos(\tau) \rightarrow -\sin (\tau)$ and $\sin (\tau) \rightarrow \cos (\tau)\;$since the particle there is initially moving in the +y direction instead of in the +x direction here.

== Derivation using biquaternions ==
Biquaternions or complex quaternions make the derivation of Thomas precession simple. Biquaternions are a non-commutative associative algebra and are also a four dimensional vector space over the complex number field. We shall use Girard's notation, in which the biquaternion basis set is $\{1 \text{,}\,\mathbf i \text{,} \, \mathbf j \text{,} \, \mathbf k\}$ with the multiplication table $\mathbf i^2 \,= \, \mathbf j^2\,=\,\mathbf k^2\,=\,\mathbf i \,\mathbf j\, \mathbf k \,=\,-1$ and in which $i'$ is the square root of $-1$. The conjugate $\mathbf i \rightarrow -\mathbf i \text{,} \;\; \mathbf j \rightarrow -\mathbf j \text{,} \;\; \mathbf k \rightarrow -\mathbf k$ is denoted by a subscript lower case letter c, so that $(a\,+\,b\,\mathbf i\,+\,c\,\mathbf j\,+\, d\,\mathbf k)_c \, = \, a\, - \, b \, \mathbf i \, - \, c\, \mathbf j \, - \, d \,\mathbf k$ where $a\text{,} \, b\text{,} \, c\,\text{,} \, d$ are complex numbers. The conjugate of a product is the product of the conjugates in reverse order so that $(q_1\,q_2)_c\,=\,(q_2)_c \, (q_1)_c$. An asterisk superscript denotes the complex conjugate so that $i'^*= -i'$ and $(a\,+\,b\,\mathbf i\,+\,c\,\mathbf j\,+\, d\,\mathbf k)^* \, = \, a^*\, + \, b^* \, \mathbf i \, + \, c^*\, \mathbf j \, + \, d^* \,\mathbf k$. The complex conjugate of a product is the product of the complex conjugates in the same order. The norm is defined as $N(a\,+\,b\,\mathbf i\,+\,c\,\mathbf j\,+\, d\,\mathbf k)\,=\,a^2+b^2+c^2+d^2$, and has the important property that the norm of a product is the product of the norms, making the biquaternions a composition algebra. The norm of a non-zero biquaternion can be any complex number, including zero.

Girard shows how any proper orthochronous Lorentz transformation can be written in the form
$$X'\, = \, a\,X\,a^*_c$$
where $a\,a_c\,=\,1$ and so has norm one and $X$ has the form
$$X \, = \, c \, t \, + \, i' \, x \, \mathbf i \, +\, i' \,y \,\mathbf j \, + \, i' \, z \,\mathbf k$$
which he calls a minkowskian quaternion or minquat. Note that $X = X^*_c$ and that $X'$ is also a minquat and has the same norm as $X$, and so has the same spacetime interval squared $(c\,t')^2-x'^2-y'^2-z'^2 \, = \, (c\,t)^2-x^2-y^2-z^2$, where c is the speed of light and $t\text{,} \, x \text{,} \, y \text{,} \, z$ are the cartesian coordinates in $X$, and likewise for $t'\text{,} \, x' \text{,} \, y' \text{,} \, z'$ in $X'$.

We assume constant velocity with the acceleration vector perpendicular to the velocity vector. Assume initially that the particle is moving in the +x direction and that it undergoes a small transverse acceleration in the +y direction so that its new direction is at angle $\delta \theta_{\text{boost}}$ to the +x axis. A constant magnitude acceleration which is always perpendicular to the velocity vector results in circular motion. We shall follow the Mathematical explanation given earlier in this article except for the use of biquaternions instead of 4x4 matrices. So

$$\Lambda\equiv\mathbf B( \mathbf {\beta} + \delta \mathbf {\beta}) \, \mathbf B(-\mathbf {\beta}) \, = \, \mathbf R(\Delta \theta_{rot})  \mathbf B(\Delta   \alpha)$$
where the Lorentz boosts $\mathbf B(\beta) \text{,} \, \mathbf B(\beta + \delta \beta) \text{, and } \mathbf B(\Delta \alpha)$ and the spatial rotation $\mathbf R(\Delta \theta_{\text{rot}})$ are now biquaternions instead of 4x4 matrices. The last equality follows since, as shown by Girard, any proper orthochronous Lorentz transformation can be written as a spatial rotation followed by a Lorentz boost or vice versa.

Then to first order

$$\begin {align} B( \mathbf {\beta} + \delta \mathbf {\beta}) \,* \mathbf B(-\mathbf {\beta}) \,&= \,\bigg ( \cosh\bigg(\frac{\alpha}{2}\bigg) + i' \, \big (\mathbf i + \delta \theta_{\text{boost}} \mathbf j \big) \, \sinh \bigg(\frac{\alpha}{2} \bigg ) \bigg)\, \; \\
&* \;\, \bigg (\cosh\bigg(\frac{\alpha}{2}\bigg) - i' \, \mathbf i \,\sinh\bigg(\frac{\alpha}{2}\bigg) \,  \bigg ) \\
& = \bigg(1 +i'\, \mathbf j \, \sinh \big(\frac{\alpha}{2} \big)\, \cosh \big(\frac{\alpha}{2} \big) \, \delta \theta_{boost} \, - \, \mathbf k \, \sinh^2 \big(\frac{\alpha}{2} \big) \, \delta \theta_{\text{boost}}\bigg)
\end {align}$$

To first order the velocity does not change, only its direction. To first order this should equal

$$\mathbf R(\Delta \theta_{\text{rot}})  \mathbf B(\Delta \alpha) = \bigg(1+\frac{\Delta \theta_{\text{rot}}}{2} \, \mathbf k \bigg)\, \; \bigg ( 1\,+\, \frac{\Delta \alpha}{2} \, i'\,\mathbf j\bigg )$$

To first order this gives
$$\begin {align}\Delta \theta_{\text{rot}} \, &= \, -2 \, \sinh^2 \bigg(\frac{\alpha}{2} \bigg) \, \delta \theta_{\text{boost}} \\
\Delta \alpha &= 2\,\sinh \bigg(\frac{\alpha}{2} \bigg) \, \cosh \bigg(\frac{\alpha}{2} \bigg) \, \delta \theta_{\text{boost}}\end {align}$$

These equations can be rewritten as

$$\begin{align}\Delta \theta_{\text{rot}}\, &= \, -(\cosh(\alpha)-1)\, \delta \theta_{\text{boost}}\,=\,-(\gamma-1)\,\delta \theta_{\text{boost}} \\
\\
\Delta \alpha &= \sinh(\alpha) \, \delta \theta_{\text{boost}}\,=\,\gamma \, \beta \, \delta \theta_{\text{boost}} \end{align}$$

The minus sign indicates that the precession is retrograde. Here

$$\begin{align}\beta\,&=\,\frac{v}{c} \\ \gamma\,&=\,\frac{1}{\sqrt{1-\frac{v^2}{c^2}}}\end{align}$$
where $v$ is the velocity and $c$ is the speed of light.

=== Precession in a circular orbit ===
The Thomas precession in one orbit will be

$$\Delta \theta_{\text{rot per orbit}} \, = \, \bigg ( \frac {2\pi} {\delta \theta_{\text{boost}}} \bigg ) \; \Delta \theta_{\text{rot}}\,=\,-2 \pi (\gamma-1)$$

== Applications ==
=== In electron orbitals ===
In quantum mechanics Thomas precession is a correction to the spin-orbit interaction, which takes into account the relativistic time dilation between the electron and the nucleus in hydrogenic atoms.

Basically, it states that spinning objects precess when they accelerate in special relativity because Lorentz boosts do not commute with each other.

To calculate the spin of a particle in a magnetic field, one must also take into account Larmor precession.

=== In a Foucault pendulum ===
The rotation of the swing plane of Foucault pendulum can be treated as a result of parallel transport of the pendulum in a 2-dimensional sphere of Euclidean space. The hyperbolic space of velocities in Minkowski spacetime represents a 3-dimensional (pseudo-) sphere with imaginary radius and imaginary timelike coordinate. Parallel transport of a spinning particle in relativistic velocity space leads to Thomas precession, which is similar to the rotation of the swing plane of a Foucault pendulum. The angle of rotation in both cases is determined by the area integral of curvature in agreement with the Gauss–Bonnet theorem.

Thomas precession gives a correction to the precession of a Foucault pendulum. For a Foucault pendulum located in the city of Nijmegen in the Netherlands the correction is:

$$\omega \approx 9.5 \cdot 10^{-7}\, \mathrm{arcseconds} / \mathrm{day}.$$

Note that it is more than two orders of magnitude smaller than the precession due to the general-relativistic correction arising from frame-dragging, the Lense–Thirring precession.

== See also ==
- Velocity-addition formula
- Relativistic angular momentum
- Holonomy

== Textbooks ==
- Jackson, J. D. (1999). "Chapter 11". Classical Electrodynamics (3d ed.). John Wiley & Sons. ISBN 978-0-471-30932-1.
- Landau, L.D.; Lifshitz, E.M. (2002) [1939]. The Classical Theory of Fields. Course of Theoretical Physics. Vol. 2 (4th ed.). Butterworth–Heinemann. p. 38. ISBN 0-7506-2768-9.
- Rindler, W. (2006) [2001]. "Chapter 9". Relativity Special, General and Cosmological (2nd ed.). Dallas: Oxford University Press. ISBN 978-0-19-856732-5.
- Ryder, L. H. (1996) [1985]. Quantum Field Theory (2nd ed.). Cambridge: Cambridge University Press. ISBN 978-0521478144.
- Sard, R. D. (1970). Relativistic Mechanics - Special Relativity and Classical Particle Dynamics. New York: W. A. Benjamin. ISBN 978-0805384918.
- Sexl, R. U.; Urbantke, H. K. (2001) [1992]. Relativity, Groups Particles. Special Relativity and Relativistic Symmetry in Field and Particle Physics. Springer. pp. 38–43. ISBN 978-3211834435.
