= Relativistic speed =

Speed at which relativistic effects become significant

Relativistic speed refers to speed at which relativistic effects become significant to the desired accuracy of measurement of the phenomenon being observed. Relativistic effects are those discrepancies between values calculated by models considering and not considering relativity. Related words are velocity, rapidity, and celerity which is proper velocity. Speed is a scalar, being the magnitude of the velocity vector which in relativity is the four-velocity and in three-dimension Euclidean space a three-velocity. Speed is empirically measured as average speed, although current devices in common use can estimate speed over very small intervals and closely approximate instantaneous speed. Non-relativistic discrepancies include cosine error which occurs in speed detection devices when only one scalar component of the three-velocity is measured and the Doppler effect which may affect observations of wavelength and frequency.

Lorentz factor, γ, as a function of speed, v. Its initial value is 1 when speed is zero and increases without bound as speed approaches light speed, c.

Inverse of Lorentz factor as a function of speed, v, as a proportion of light speed, c - a circular arc.

Relativistic effects are highly non-linear and for everyday purposes are insignificant because the Newtonian model closely approximates the relativity model. In special relativity the Lorentz factor is a measure of time dilation, length contraction and the relativistic mass increase of a moving object.

== See also ==
- Lorentz factor
- Relative velocity
- Relativistic beaming
- Relativistic jet
- Relativistic mass
- Relativistic particle
- Relativistic plasma
- Relativistic wave equations
- Special relativity
- Ultrarelativistic limit
