= Relativistic particle =

Elementary particle which moves close to the speed of light

In particle physics, a relativistic particle is an elementary particle with kinetic energy greater than or equal to its rest-mass energy given by Einstein's relation, $E_0=m_0c^2$, or specifically, of which the velocity is comparable to the speed of light $c$.

This is achieved by photons to the extent that effects described by special relativity are able to describe those of such particles themselves. Several approaches exist as a means of describing the motion of single and multiple relativistic particles, with a prominent example being postulations through the Dirac equation of single particle motion.

Since the energy-momentum relation of a particle can be written as:

$E^2 = (p \textrm c)^2 + \left(m_0 \textrm c^2\right)^2\,$

1

where $E$ is the energy, $p$ is the momentum, and $m_0$ is the rest mass, when the rest mass tends to be zero, e.g. for a photon, or the momentum tends to be large, e.g. for a large-speed proton, this relation will collapse into a linear dispersion, i.e.

$E= p \textrm c$

2

This is different from the parabolic energy-momentum relation for classical particles. Thus, in practice, the linearity or the non-parabolicity of the energy-momentum relation is considered as a key feature for relativistic particles. These two types of relativistic particles are remarked as massless and massive, respectively.

In experiments, massive particles are relativistic when their kinetic energy is comparable to or greater than the energy $E_0=m_0c^2$ corresponding to their rest mass. In other words, a massive particle is relativistic when its total mass-energy is at least twice its rest mass. This condition implies that the speed of the particle is close to the speed of light. According to the Lorentz factor formula, this requires the particle to move at roughly 85% of the speed of light. Such relativistic particles are generated in particle accelerators, (Note: For example, at the Large Hadron Collider operating with a collision energy of 13 TeV, a relativistic proton has a mass-energy 6,927 times greater than its rest mass and travels at 99.999998958160351322% of the speed of light.) as well as naturally occurring in cosmic radiation. (Note: An example of this is the Oh-My-God particle.) In astrophysics, jets of relativistic plasma are produced by the centers of active galaxies and quasars.

A charged relativistic particle crossing the interface of two media with different dielectric constants emits transition radiation. This is exploited in the transition radiation detectors of high-velocity particles.

== Desktop relativistic particles ==
Relativistic electrons can also exist in some solid state materials, including semimetals such as graphene, topological insulators, bismuth antimony alloys, and semiconductors such as transitional metal dichalcogenide and black phosphorene layers. These lattice confined electrons with relativistic effects that can be described using the Dirac equation are also called desktop relativistic electrons or Dirac electrons.

== See also ==
- Ultrarelativistic particle
- Special relativity
- Relativistic wave equations
- Lorentz factor
- Relativistic mass
- Relativistic plasma
- Relativistic jet
- Relativistic beaming
