= Transition radiation =

Transition radiation (TR) is a form of electromagnetic radiation emitted when a charged particle passes through inhomogeneous media, such as a boundary between two different media. This is in contrast to Cherenkov radiation, which occurs when a charged particle passes through a homogeneous dielectric medium at a speed greater than the phase velocity of electromagnetic waves in that medium.

== History ==
Transition radiation was demonstrated theoretically by Ginzburg and Frank in 1945. They showed the existence of transition radiation when a charged particle perpendicularly passed through a boundary between two different homogeneous media. The frequency of radiation emitted in the backwards direction relative to the particle was mainly in the range of visible light. The intensity of radiation was proportional to the logarithm of the Lorentz factor of the particle. After the first observation of the transition radiation in the optical region, many early studies indicated that the application of the optical transition radiation for the detection and identification of individual particles seemed to be severely limited due to the inherent low intensity of the radiation.

Interest in transition radiation was renewed when Garibian showed that the radiation should also appear in the X-ray region for ultrarelativistic particles. His theory predicted some remarkable features for transition radiation in the X-ray region. In 1959, Garibian showed theoretically that energy losses of an ultrarelativistic particle, when emitting TR while passing the boundary between media and vacuum, were directly proportional to the Lorentz factor of the particle. Theoretical discovery of X-ray transition radiation, which was directly proportional to the Lorentz factor, made possible further use of TR in high-energy physics.

Thus, from 1959 intensive theoretical and experimental research of TR, and X-ray TR in particular began.

== Transition radiation in the X-ray region ==
Transition radiation in the X-ray region (TR) is produced by relativistic charged particles when they cross the interface of two media of different dielectric constants. The emitted radiation is the homogeneous difference between the two inhomogeneous solutions of Maxwell's equations of the electric and magnetic fields of the moving particle in each medium separately. In other words, since the electric field of the particle is different in each medium, the particle has to "shake off" the difference when it crosses the boundary. The total energy loss of a charged particle on the transition depends on its Lorentz factor γ = E/mc^{2} and is mostly directed forward, peaking at an angle of the order of 1/γ relative to the particle's path. The intensity of the emitted radiation is roughly proportional to the particle's energy E.

Optical transition radiation is emitted both in the forward direction and reflected by the interface surface. In case of a foil having an angle at 45 degrees with respect to a particle beam, the particle beam's shape can be visually seen at an angle of 90 degrees. More elaborate analysis of the emitted visual radiation may allow for the determination of γ and emittance.

In the approximation of relativistic motion ($\gamma \gg 1$), small angles ($\theta \ll 1$) and high frequency ($\omega \gg \omega_p$), the energy spectrum can be expressed as:

$$\frac{dI}{d \nu} \approx \frac{z^2 e^2 \gamma \omega_p}{\pi c} \bigg( ( 1 + 2 \nu^2) \ln\left(1 + \frac{1}{\nu^2}\right) - 2\bigg )$$

Where $z$ is the atomic charge, $e$ is the charge of an electron, $\gamma$ is the Lorentz factor, $\omega_p$ is the plasma frequency. This divergences at low frequencies where the approximations fail. The total energy emitted is:

$$I = \frac{z^2 e^2 \gamma \omega_p}{3 c}$$

The characteristics of this electromagnetic radiation makes it suitable for particle discrimination, particularly of electrons and hadrons in the momentum range between 1 GeV/c and 100 GeV/c. The transition radiation photons produced by electrons have wavelengths in the X-ray range, with energies typically in the range from 5 to 15 keV. However, the number of produced photons per interface crossing is very small: for particles with γ = 2×10^{3}, about 0.8 X-ray photons are detected. Usually several layers of alternating materials or composites are used to collect enough transition radiation photons for an adequate measurement—for example, one layer of inert material followed by one layer of detector (e.g. microstrip gas chamber), and so on.

By placing interfaces (foils) of very precise thickness and foil separation, coherence effects will modify the transition radiation's spectral and angular characteristics. This allows a much higher number of photons to be obtained in a smaller angular "volume". Applications of this X-ray source are limited by the fact that the radiation is emitted in a cone, with a minimum intensity at the center. X-ray focusing devices (crystals/mirrors) are not easy to build for such radiation patterns.

A special type of transition radiation is diffusive radiation. It is emitted provided that a charged particle crosses a medium with randomly inhomogeneous dielectric permittivity^{9,10,11}.

== See also ==
- Transition radiation detector

== Sources ==
- Interference phenomenon in optical transition radiation and its application to particle beam diagnostics and multiple-scattering measurements, L. Wartski et al., Journal of Applied Physics -- August 1975 -- Volume 46, Issue 8, pp. 3644-3653.
