= Dimensional analysis =

Analysis of the dimensions of different physical quantities

In engineering and science, dimensional analysis of different physical quantities is the analysis of their physical dimension or quantity dimension, defined as a mathematical expression identifying the powers of the base quantities involved (such as length, mass, time, etc.), and tracking these dimensions as calculations or comparisons are performed. The concepts of dimensional analysis and quantity dimension were introduced by Joseph Fourier in 1822.

Commensurable physical quantities have the same dimension and are of the same kind, so they can be directly compared to each other, even if they are expressed in differing units of measurement; e.g., metres and feet, grams and pounds, seconds and years. Incommensurable physical quantities have different dimensions, so can not be directly compared to each other, no matter what units they are expressed in, e.g. metres and grams, seconds and grams, metres and seconds. For example, asking whether a gram is larger than an hour is meaningless.

Any physically meaningful equation or inequality must have the same dimensions on its left and right sides, a property known as dimensional homogeneity. Checking for dimensional homogeneity is a common application of dimensional analysis, serving as a plausibility check on derived equations and computations. It also serves as a guide and constraint in deriving equations that may describe a physical system in the absence of a more rigorous derivation.

== Formulation ==
The Buckingham π theorem describes how every physically meaningful equation involving n variables can be equivalently rewritten as an equation of n − m dimensionless parameters, where m is the rank of the dimensional matrix. Furthermore, and most importantly, it provides a method for computing these dimensionless parameters from the given variables.

A dimensional equation can have the dimensions reduced or eliminated through nondimensionalization, which begins with dimensional analysis, and involves scaling quantities by characteristic units of a system or physical constants of nature. This may give insight into the fundamental properties of the system, as illustrated in the examples below.

The dimension of a physical quantity can be expressed as a product of the base physical dimensions such as length, mass and time, each raised to an integer (and occasionally rational) power. The dimension of a physical quantity is more fundamental than some scale or unit used to express the amount of that physical quantity. For example, mass is a dimension, while the kilogram is a particular reference quantity chosen to express a quantity of mass. The choice of unit is arbitrary, and its choice is often based on historical precedent. Natural units, being based on only universal constants, may be thought of as being "less arbitrary".

There are many possible choices of base physical dimensions. The SI standard selects the following dimensions and corresponding dimension symbols:

time (T), length (L), mass (M), electric current (I), absolute temperature (Θ), amount of substance (N) and luminous intensity (J).

The symbols are by convention usually written in roman sans serif typeface. Mathematically, the dimension of the quantity Q is given by
$$\operatorname{dim} Q = \mathsf{T}^a \mathsf{L}^b \mathsf{M}^c \mathsf{I}^d \mathsf{\Theta}^e \mathsf{N}^f \mathsf{J}^g$$
where a, b, c, d, e, f, g are the dimensional exponents. Other physical quantities could be defined as the base quantities, as long as they form a basis – for instance, one could replace the dimension (I) of electric current of the SI basis with a dimension (Q) of electric charge, since Q = TI.

A quantity that has only b ≠ 0 (with all other exponents zero) is known as a geometric quantity. A quantity that has only both a ≠ 0 and b ≠ 0 is known as a kinematic quantity. A quantity that has only all of a ≠ 0, b ≠ 0, and c ≠ 0 is known as a dynamic quantity. A quantity that has all exponents null is said to have dimension one.

The unit chosen to express a physical quantity and its dimension are related, but not identical concepts. The units of a physical quantity are defined by convention and related to some standard; e.g., length may have units of metres, feet, inches, miles or micrometres; but any length always has a dimension of L, no matter what units of length are chosen to express it. Two different units of the same physical quantity have conversion factors that relate them. For example, 1 in = 2.54 cm; in this case 2.54 cm/in is the conversion factor, which is itself dimensionless and equal to 1. Therefore, multiplying by that conversion factor does not change either the dimensions nor the value of the physical quantity.

There are also physicists who have cast doubt on the very existence of incompatible fundamental dimensions of physical quantity, although this does not invalidate the usefulness of dimensional analysis.

=== Simple cases ===
As examples, the dimension of the physical quantity velocity v is
$$\operatorname{dim}v
= \frac{\text{length}}{\text{time}}
= \frac{\mathsf{L}}{\mathsf{T}}
= \mathsf{T}^{-1}\mathsf{L} .$$

The dimension of the physical quantity acceleration a is
$$\operatorname{dim}a
= \frac{\text{velocity}}{\text{time}}
= \frac{\mathsf{T}^{-1}\mathsf{L}}{\mathsf{T}}
= \mathsf{T}^{-2}\mathsf{L} .$$

The dimension of the physical quantity force F is
$$\operatorname{dim}F
= \text{mass} \times \text{acceleration}
= \mathsf{M} \times \mathsf{T}^{-2}\mathsf{L}
= \mathsf{T}^{-2}\mathsf{L}\mathsf{M} .$$

The dimension of the physical quantity pressure P is
$$\operatorname{dim}P
= \frac{\text{force}}{\text{area}}
= \frac{\mathsf{T}^{-2}\mathsf{L}\mathsf{M}}{\mathsf{L}^2}
= \mathsf{T}^{-2}\mathsf{L}^{-1}\mathsf{M} .$$

The dimension of the physical quantity energy E is
$$\operatorname{dim}E
= \text{force} \times \text{displacement}
= \mathsf{T}^{-2}\mathsf{L}\mathsf{M} \times \mathsf{L}
= \mathsf{T}^{-2}\mathsf{L}^2\mathsf{M} .$$

The dimension of the physical quantity power P is
$$\operatorname{dim}P
= \frac{\text{energy}}{\text{time}}
= \frac{\mathsf{T}^{-2}\mathsf{L}^2\mathsf{M}}{\mathsf{T}}
= \mathsf{T}^{-3}\mathsf{L}^2\mathsf{M} .$$

The dimension of the physical quantity electric charge Q is
$$\operatorname{dim}Q
= \text{current} \times \text{time}
= \mathsf{T}\mathsf{I} .$$

The dimension of the physical quantity voltage V is
$$\operatorname{dim}V
= \frac{\text{power}}{\text{current}}
= \frac{\mathsf{T}^{-3}\mathsf{L}^2\mathsf{M}}{\mathsf{I}}
= \mathsf{T^{-3}}\mathsf{L}^2\mathsf{M} \mathsf{I}^{-1} .$$

The dimension of the physical quantity capacitance C is
$$\operatorname{dim}C
= \frac{\text{electric charge}}{\text{electric potential difference}}
= \frac {\mathsf{T}\mathsf{I}}{\mathsf{T}^{-3}\mathsf{L}^2\mathsf{M}\mathsf{I}^{-1}}
= \mathsf{T^4}\mathsf{L^{-2}}\mathsf{M^{-1}}\mathsf{I^2} .$$

=== Rayleigh's method ===
In dimensional analysis, Rayleigh's method is a conceptual tool used in physics, chemistry, and engineering. It expresses a functional relationship of some variables in the form of an exponential equation. It was named after Lord Rayleigh.

The method involves the following steps:

1. Gather all the independent variables that are likely to influence the dependent variable.
2. If R is a variable that depends upon independent variables R_{1}, R_{2}, R_{3}, ..., R_{n}, then the functional equation can be written as R = F(R_{1}, R_{2}, R_{3}, ..., R_{n}).
3. Write the above equation in the form R = C R_{1}^{a} R_{2}^{b} R_{3}^{c} ... R_{n}^{m}, where C is a dimensionless constant and a, b, c, ..., m are arbitrary exponents.
4. Express each of the quantities in the equation in some base units in which the solution is required.
5. By using dimensional homogeneity, obtain a set of simultaneous equations involving the exponents a, b, c, ..., m.
6. Solve these equations to obtain the values of the exponents a, b, c, ..., m.
7. Substitute the values of exponents in the main equation, and form the non-dimensional parameters by grouping the variables with like exponents.

As a drawback, Rayleigh's method does not provide any information regarding number of dimensionless groups to be obtained as a result of dimensional analysis.

== Concrete numbers and base units ==
Many parameters and measurements in the physical sciences and engineering are expressed as a concrete number—a numerical quantity and a corresponding dimensional unit. Often a quantity is expressed in terms of several other quantities; for example, speed is a combination of length and time, e.g. 60 kilometres per hour or 1.4 kilometres per second. Compound relations with "per" are expressed with division, e.g. 60 km/h. Other relations can involve multiplication (often shown with a centered dot or juxtaposition), powers (like m^{2} for square metres), or combinations thereof.

A set of base units for a system of measurement is a conventionally chosen set of units, none of which can be expressed as a combination of the others and in terms of which all the remaining units of the system can be expressed. For example, units for length and time are normally chosen as base units. Units for volume, however, can be factored into the base units of length (m^{3}), thus they are considered derived or compound units.

Sometimes the names of units obscure the fact that they are derived units. For example, a newton (N) is a unit of force, which may be expressed as the product of mass (with unit kg) and acceleration (with unit m⋅s^{−2}). The newton is defined as 1 N = 1 kg⋅m⋅s^{−2}.

=== Percentages, derivatives and integrals ===
Percentages are dimensionless quantities, since they are ratios of two quantities with the same dimensions. In other words, the % sign can be read as "hundredths", since 1% = 1/100.

Taking a derivative with respect to a quantity divides the dimension by the dimension of the variable that is differentiated with respect to. Thus:

- position (x) has the dimension L (length);
- derivative of position with respect to time (dx/dt, velocity) has dimension T^{−1}L—length from position, time due to the derivative;
- the second derivative (d^{2}x/dt^{2} = d(dx/dt) / dt, acceleration) has dimension T^{−2}L.

Likewise, taking an integral adds the dimension of the variable one is integrating with respect to, but in the numerator.

- force has the dimension T^{−2}LM (mass multiplied by acceleration);
- the integral of force with respect to the distance (s) the object has travelled ($\textstyle\int F\ ds$, work) has dimension T^{−2}L^{2}M.

In economics, one distinguishes between stocks and flows: a stock has a unit (say, widgets or dollars), while a flow is a derivative of a stock, and has a unit of the form of this unit divided by one of time (say, dollars/year).

In some contexts, dimensional quantities are expressed as dimensionless quantities or percentages by omitting some dimensions. For example, debt-to-GDP ratios are generally expressed as percentages: total debt outstanding (dimension of currency) divided by annual GDP (dimension of currency)—but one may argue that, in comparing a stock to a flow, annual GDP should have dimensions of currency/time (dollars/year, for instance) and thus debt-to-GDP should have the unit year, which indicates that debt-to-GDP is the number of years needed for a constant GDP to pay the debt, if all GDP is spent on the debt and the debt is otherwise unchanged.

== Dimensional homogeneity (commensurability) ==
The most basic rule of dimensional analysis is that of dimensional homogeneity.

Only commensurable quantities (physical quantities having the same dimension) may be compared, equated, added, or subtracted.

However, the dimensions form an abelian group under multiplication, so:

One may take ratios of incommensurable quantities (quantities with different dimensions), and multiply or divide them.

For example, it makes no sense to ask whether 1 hour is more, the same, or less than 1 kilometre, as these have different dimensions, nor to add 1 hour to 1 kilometre. However, it makes sense to ask whether 1 mile is more, the same, or less than 1 kilometre, being the same dimension of physical quantity even though the units are different. On the other hand, if an object travels 100 km in 2 hours, one may divide these and conclude that the object's average speed was 50 km/h.

The rule implies that in a physically meaningful expression only quantities of the same dimension can be added, subtracted, or compared. For example, if m_{man}, m_{rat} and L_{man} denote, respectively, the mass of some man, the mass of a rat and the height of that man, the dimensionally homogeneous expression m_{man} + m_{rat} is meaningful, but the heterogeneous expression m_{man} + L_{man} is meaningless. However, m_{man}/L^{2}_{man} is fine. Thus, dimensional analysis may be used as a sanity check of physical equations: the two sides of any equation must be commensurable or have the same dimensions.

Even when two physical quantities have identical dimensions, it may nevertheless be meaningless to compare or add them. For example, although torque and energy share the dimension T^{−2}L^{2}M, they are fundamentally different physical quantities.

To compare, add, or subtract quantities with the same dimensions but expressed in different units, the standard procedure is first to convert them all to the same unit. For example, to compare 32 metres with 35 yards, use 1 yard = 0.9144 m to convert 35 yards to 32.004 m.

A related principle is that any physical law that accurately describes the real world must be independent of the units used to measure the physical variables. For example, Newton's laws of motion must hold true whether distance is measured in miles or kilometres. This principle gives rise to the form that a conversion factor between two units that measure the same dimension must take multiplication by a simple constant. It also ensures equivalence; for example, if two buildings are the same height in feet, then they must be the same height in metres.

For example, if one is calculating a speed, units must always combine to L/T; if one is calculating an energy, units must always combine to ML^{2}/T^{2}, etc. For example, the following formulae could be valid expressions for some energy:
$$E_\text{k} = \frac 12 m v^2 ;~~ E = m c^2 ;~~ E = p v ; ~~ E = \frac{hc}{\lambda}$$
if m is a mass, v and c are velocities, p is a momentum, h is the Planck constant, λ a length. On the other hand, if the units of the right hand side do not combine to [mass][length]^{2}/[time]^{2}, it cannot be a valid expression for some energy.

Being homogeneous does not necessarily mean the equation will be true, since it does not take into account numerical factors. For example, E = mv^{2} could be or could not be the correct formula for the energy of a particle of mass m traveling at speed v, and one cannot know if hc/λ should be divided or multiplied by 2π.

== Conversion factor ==
In dimensional analysis, a quotient which converts one unit of measure into another without changing the quantity is called a conversion factor. For example, kPa and bar are both units of pressure, and 100 kPa = 1 bar. The rules of algebra allow both sides of an equation to be divided by the same expression, so this is equivalent to 100 kPa / 1 bar = 1. Since any quantity can be multiplied by 1 without changing it, the expression "100 kPa / 1 bar" can be used to convert from bars to kPa by multiplying it with the quantity to be converted, including the unit. For example, 5 bar × 100 kPa / 1 bar = 500 kPa because 5 × 100 / 1 = 500, and bar/bar cancels out, so 5 bar = 500 kPa.

== Applications ==
Dimensional analysis is most often used in physics and chemistry – and in the mathematics thereof – but finds some applications outside of those fields as well.

=== Mathematics ===
A simple application of dimensional analysis to mathematics is in computing the form of the volume of an n-ball (the solid ball in n dimensions), or the area of its surface, the n-sphere: being an n-dimensional figure, the volume scales as x^{n}, while the surface area, being (n − 1)-dimensional, scales as x^{n−1}. Thus the volume of the n-ball in terms of the radius is C_{n}r^{n}, for some constant C_{n}. Determining the constant takes more involved mathematics, but the form can be deduced and checked by dimensional analysis alone.

=== Finance, economics, and accounting ===
In finance, economics, and accounting, dimensional analysis is most commonly referred to in terms of the distinction between stocks and flows. More generally, dimensional analysis is used in interpreting various financial ratios, economics ratios, and accounting ratios.

- For example, the P/E ratio has dimensions of time (unit: year), and can be interpreted as "years of earnings to earn the price paid".
- In economics, debt-to-GDP ratio also has the unit year (debt has a unit of currency, GDP has a unit of currency/year).
- Velocity of money has a unit of 1/years (GDP/money supply has a unit of currency/year over currency): how often a unit of currency circulates per year.
- Annual continuously compounded interest rates and simple interest rates are often expressed as a percentage (adimensional quantity) while time is expressed as an adimensional quantity consisting of the number of years. However, if the time includes year as the unit of measure, the dimension of the rate is 1/year. Of course, there is nothing special (apart from the usual convention) about using year as a unit of time: any other time unit can be used. Furthermore, if rate and time include their units of measure, the use of different units for each is not problematic. In contrast, rate and time need to refer to a common period if they are adimensional. (Note that effective interest rates can only be defined as adimensional quantities.)
- In financial analysis, bond duration can be defined as (dV/dr)/V, where V is the value of a bond (or portfolio), r is the continuously compounded interest rate and dV/dr is a derivative. From the previous point, the dimension of r is 1/time. Therefore, the dimension of duration is time (usually expressed in years) because dr is in the "denominator" of the derivative.

=== Fluid mechanics ===
In fluid mechanics, dimensional analysis is performed to obtain dimensionless pi terms or groups. According to the principles of dimensional analysis, any prototype can be described by a series of these terms or groups that describe the behaviour of the system. Using suitable pi terms or groups, it is possible to develop a similar set of pi terms for a model that has the same dimensional relationships. In other words, pi terms provide a shortcut to developing a model representing a certain prototype. Common dimensionless groups in fluid mechanics include:

- Reynolds number (Re), generally important in all types of fluid problems:
  $$\mathrm{Re} = \frac{\rho u d}{\mu}.$$
- Froude number (Fr), modeling flow with a free surface:
  $$\mathrm{Fr} = \frac{u}{\sqrt{gL}}.$$
- Euler number (Eu), used in problems in which pressure is of interest:
  $$\mathrm{Eu} = \frac{\Delta p}{\rho u^2}.$$
- Mach number (Ma), important in high speed flows where the velocity approaches or exceeds the local speed of sound:
  $$\mathrm{Ma} = \frac{u}{c_s},$$
  where c_{s} is the local speed of sound.

== History ==
The origins of dimensional analysis have been disputed by historians. The first written application of dimensional analysis has been credited to François Daviet, a student of Joseph-Louis Lagrange, in a 1799 article at the Turin Academy of Science.

This led to the conclusion that meaningful laws must be homogeneous equations in their various units of measurement, a result which was eventually later formalized in the Buckingham π theorem. Simeon Poisson also treated the same problem of the parallelogram law by Daviet, in his treatise of 1811 and 1833 (vol I, p. 39). In the second edition of 1833, Poisson explicitly introduces the term dimension instead of the Daviet homogeneity.

In 1822, the important Napoleonic scientist Joseph Fourier made the first credited important contributions based on the idea that physical laws like F = ma should be independent of the units employed to measure the physical variables.

James Clerk Maxwell and Fleeming Jenkin played a major role in establishing modern use of dimensional analysis by distinguishing mass, length, and time as fundamental units, while referring to other units as derived. Although Maxwell defined length, time and mass to be "the three fundamental units", he also noted that gravitational mass can be derived from length and time by assuming a form of Newton's law of universal gravitation in which the gravitational constant G is taken as unity, thereby defining M = T^{−2}L^{3}. By assuming a form of Coulomb's law in which the Coulomb constant k_{e} is taken as unity, Maxwell then determined that the dimensions of an electrostatic unit of charge were Q = T^{−1}L^{3/2}M^{1/2}, which, after substituting his M = T^{−2}L^{3} equation for mass, results in charge having the same dimensions as mass, viz. Q = T^{−2}L^{3}.

Dimensional analysis is also used to derive relationships between the physical quantities that are involved in a particular phenomenon that one wishes to understand and characterize. It was used for the first time in this way in 1872 by Lord Rayleigh, who was trying to understand why the sky is blue. Rayleigh first published the technique in his 1877 book The Theory of Sound.

The original meaning of the word dimension, in Fourier's Theorie de la Chaleur, was the numerical value of the exponents of the base units. For example, acceleration was considered to have the dimension 1 with respect to the unit of length, and the dimension −2 with respect to the unit of time. This was slightly changed by Maxwell, who said the dimensions of acceleration are T^{−2}L, instead of just the exponents.

== Examples ==
=== A simple example: period of a harmonic oscillator ===
What is the period of oscillation T of a mass m attached to an ideal linear spring with spring constant k suspended in gravity of strength g? That period is the solution for T of some dimensionless equation in the variables T, m, k, and g. The four quantities have the following dimensions: T (T); m (M); k (M/T^{2}); and g (L/T^{2}). From these we can form only one dimensionless product of powers of our chosen variables, G_{1} = T^{2}k/m (T^{2} · M/T^{2} / M = 1), and putting G_{1} = C for some dimensionless constant C gives the dimensionless equation sought. The dimensionless product of powers of variables is sometimes referred to as a dimensionless group of variables; here the term "group" means "collection" rather than mathematical group. They are often called dimensionless numbers as well.

The variable g does not occur in the group. It is easy to see that it is impossible to form a dimensionless product of powers that combines g with k, m, and T, because g is the only quantity that involves the dimension L. This implies that in this problem the g is irrelevant. Dimensional analysis can sometimes yield strong statements about the irrelevance of some quantities in a problem, or the need for additional parameters. If we have chosen enough variables to properly describe the problem, then from this argument we can conclude that the period of the mass on the spring is independent of g: it is the same on the earth or the moon. The equation demonstrating the existence of a product of powers for our problem can be written in an entirely equivalent way: $T = \kappa \sqrt\tfrac{m}{k}$, for some dimensionless constant κ (equal to $\sqrt{C}$ from the original dimensionless equation).

When faced with a case where dimensional analysis rejects a variable (g, here) that one intuitively expects to belong in a physical description of the situation, another possibility is that the rejected variable is in fact relevant, but that some other relevant variable has been omitted, which might combine with the rejected variable to form a dimensionless quantity. That is, however, not the case here.

When dimensional analysis yields only one dimensionless group, as here, there are no unknown functions, and the solution is said to be "complete" – although it still may involve unknown dimensionless constants, such as κ.

=== A more complex example: energy of a vibrating wire ===
Consider the case of a vibrating wire of length ℓ (L) vibrating with an amplitude A (L). The wire has a linear density ρ (M/L) and is under tension s (LM/T^{2}), and we want to know the energy E (L^{2}M/T^{2}) in the wire. Let π_{1} and π_{2} be two dimensionless products of powers of the variables chosen, given by
$$\begin{align}
\pi_1 &= \frac{E}{As} \\
\pi_2 &= \frac{\ell}{A}.
\end{align}$$

The linear density of the wire is not involved. The two groups found can be combined into an equivalent form as an equation
$$F\left(\frac{E}{As}, \frac{\ell}{A}\right) = 0 ,$$
where F is some unknown function, or, equivalently as
$$E = As f{\left(\frac{\ell}{A}\right)} ,$$
where f is some other unknown function. Here the unknown function implies that our solution is now incomplete, but dimensional analysis has given us something that may not have been obvious: the energy is proportional to the first power of the tension. Barring further analytical analysis, we might proceed to experiments to discover the form for the unknown function f. But our experiments are simpler than in the absence of dimensional analysis. We'd perform none to verify that the energy is proportional to the tension. Or perhaps we might guess that the energy is proportional to ℓ, and so infer that E = ℓs. The power of dimensional analysis as an aid to experiment and forming hypotheses becomes evident.

The power of dimensional analysis really becomes apparent when it is applied to situations, unlike those given above, that are more complicated, the set of variables involved are not apparent, and the underlying equations hopelessly complex. Consider, for example, a small pebble sitting on the bed of a river. If the river flows fast enough, it will actually raise the pebble and cause it to flow along with the water. At what critical velocity will this occur? Sorting out the guessed variables is not so easy as before. But dimensional analysis can be a powerful aid in understanding problems like this, and is usually the very first tool to be applied to complex problems where the underlying equations and constraints are poorly understood. In such cases, the answer may depend on a dimensionless number such as the Reynolds number, which may be interpreted by dimensional analysis.

=== A third example: demand versus capacity for a rotating disc ===
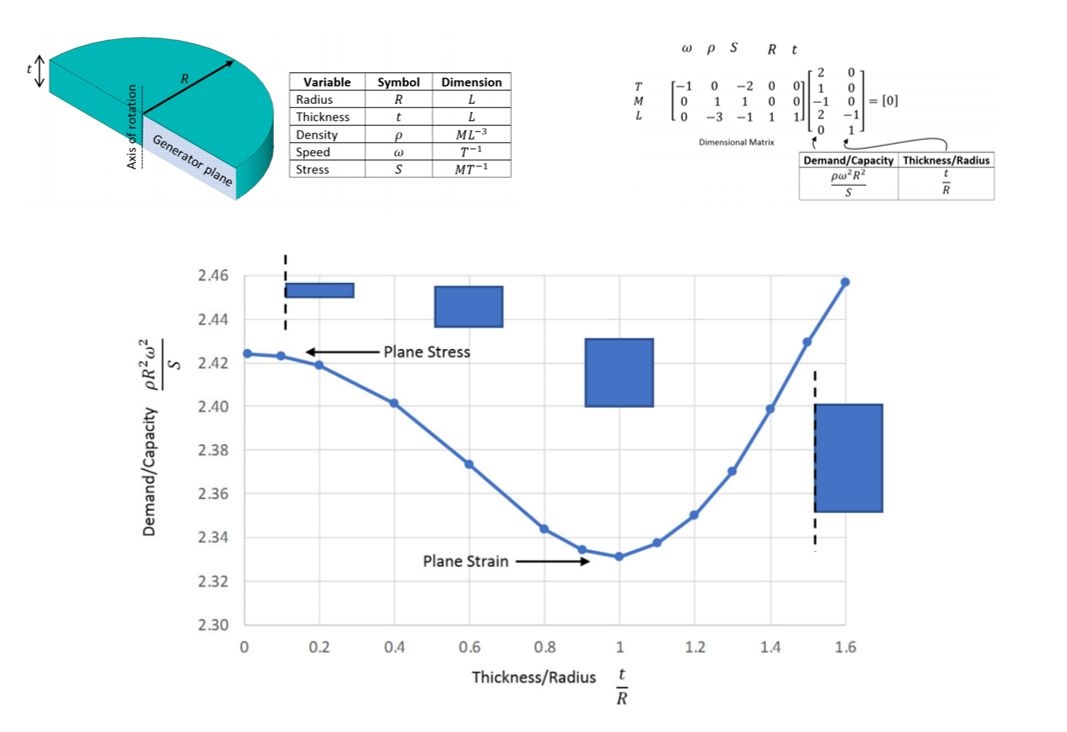
Dimensional analysis and numerical experiments for a rotating disc

Consider the case of a thin, solid, parallel-sided rotating disc of axial thickness t (L) and radius R (L). The disc has a density ρ (M/L^{3}), rotates at an angular velocity ω (T^{−1}) and this leads to a stress S (T^{−2}L^{−1}M) in the material. There is a theoretical linear elastic solution, given by Lame, to this problem when the disc is thin relative to its radius, the faces of the disc are free to move axially, and the plane stress constitutive relations can be assumed to be valid. As the disc becomes thicker relative to the radius then the plane stress solution breaks down. If the disc is restrained axially on its free faces then a state of plane strain will occur. However, if this is not the case then the state of stress may only be determined though consideration of three-dimensional elasticity and there is no known theoretical solution for this case. An engineer might, therefore, be interested in establishing a relationship between the five variables. Dimensional analysis for this case leads to the following (5 − 3 = 2) non-dimensional groups:

demand/capacity = ρR^{2}ω^{2}/S
thickness/radius or aspect ratio = t/R

Through the use of numerical experiments using, for example, the finite element method, the nature of the relationship between the two non-dimensional groups can be obtained as shown in the figure. As this problem only involves two non-dimensional groups, the complete picture is provided in a single plot and this can be used as a design/assessment chart for rotating discs.

== Properties ==
=== Mathematical properties ===
The dimensions that can be formed from a given collection of basic physical dimensions, such as T, L, and M, form an abelian group: The identity is written as 1; L^{0} = 1, and the inverse of L is 1/L or L^{−1}. L raised to any integer power p is a member of the group, having an inverse of L^{−p} or 1/L^{p}. The operation of the group is multiplication, having the usual rules for handling exponents (L^{n} × L^{m} = L^{n+m}). Physically, 1/L can be interpreted as reciprocal length, and 1/T as reciprocal time (see reciprocal second).

An abelian group is equivalent to a module over the integers, with the dimensional symbol T^{i}L^{j}M^{k} corresponding to the tuple (i, j, k). When physical measured quantities (be they like-dimensioned or unlike-dimensioned) are multiplied or divided by one other, their dimensional units are likewise multiplied or divided; this corresponds to addition or subtraction in the module. When measurable quantities are raised to an integer power, the same is done to the dimensional symbols attached to those quantities; this corresponds to scalar multiplication in the module.

A basis for such a module of dimensional symbols is called a set of base quantities, and all other vectors are called derived units. As in any module, one may choose different bases, which yields different systems of units (e.g., choosing whether the unit for charge is derived from the unit for current, or vice versa).

The group identity, the dimension of dimensionless quantities, corresponds to the origin in this module, (0, 0, 0).

In certain cases, one can define fractional dimensions, specifically by formally defining fractional powers of one-dimensional vector spaces, like V^{L^{1/2}}. However, it is not possible to take arbitrary fractional powers of units, due to representation-theoretic obstructions.

One can work with vector spaces with given dimensions without needing to use units (corresponding to coordinate systems of the vector spaces). For example, given dimensions M and L, one has the vector spaces V^{M} and V^{L}, and can define V^{ML} := V^{M} ⊗ V^{L} as the tensor product. Similarly, the dual space can be interpreted as having "negative" dimensions. This corresponds to the fact that under the natural pairing between a vector space and its dual, the dimensions cancel, leaving a dimensionless scalar.

The set of units of the physical quantities involved in a problem correspond to a set of vectors (or a matrix). The nullity describes some number (e.g., m) of ways in which these vectors can be combined to produce a zero vector. These correspond to producing (from the measurements) a number of dimensionless quantities, {π_{1}, ..., π_{m}}. (In fact these ways completely span the null subspace of another different space, of powers of the measurements.) Every possible way of multiplying (and exponentiating) together the measured quantities to produce something with the same unit as some derived quantity X can be expressed in the general form
$$X = \prod_{i=1}^m (\pi_i)^{k_i}\,.$$

Consequently, every possible commensurate equation for the physics of the system can be rewritten in the form
$$f(\pi_1,\pi_2, ..., \pi_m)=0\,.$$

Knowing this restriction can be a powerful tool for obtaining new insight into the system.

=== Mechanics ===
The dimension of physical quantities of interest in mechanics can be expressed in terms of base dimensions T, L, and M – these form a 3-dimensional vector space. This is not the only valid choice of base dimensions, but it is the one most commonly used. For example, one might choose force, length and mass as the base dimensions (as some have done), with associated dimensions F, L, M; this corresponds to a different basis, and one may convert between these representations by a change of basis. The choice of the base set of dimensions is thus a convention, with the benefit of increased utility and familiarity. The choice of base dimensions is not entirely arbitrary, because they must form a basis: they must span the space, and be linearly independent.

For example, F, L, M form a set of fundamental dimensions because they form a basis that is equivalent to T, L, M: the former can be expressed as [F = LM/T^{2}], L, M, while the latter can be expressed as [T = (LM/F)^{1/2}], L, M.

On the other hand, length, velocity and time (T, L, V) do not form a set of base dimensions for mechanics, for two reasons:

- There is no way to obtain mass – or anything derived from it, such as force – without introducing another base dimension (thus, they do not span the space).
- Velocity, being expressible in terms of length and time (V = L/T), is redundant (the set is not linearly independent).

=== Other fields of physics and chemistry ===
Depending on the field of physics, it may be advantageous to choose one or another extended set of dimensional symbols. In electromagnetism, for example, it may be useful to use dimensions of T, L, M and Q, where Q represents the dimension of electric charge. In thermodynamics, the base set of dimensions is often extended to include a dimension for temperature, Θ. In chemistry, the amount of substance (the number of molecules divided by the Avogadro constant, ≈ 6.02×10^{23} mol^{−1}) is also defined as a base dimension, N. In the interaction of relativistic plasma with strong laser pulses, a dimensionless relativistic similarity parameter, connected with the symmetry properties of the collisionless Vlasov equation, is constructed from the plasma-, electron- and critical-densities in addition to the electromagnetic vector potential. The choice of the dimensions or even the number of dimensions to be used in different fields of physics is to some extent arbitrary, but consistency in use and ease of communications are common and necessary features.

=== Polynomials and transcendental functions ===
Bridgman's theorem restricts the type of function that can be used to define a physical quantity from general (dimensionally compounded) quantities to only products of powers of the quantities, unless some of the independent quantities are algebraically combined to yield dimensionless groups, whose functions are grouped together in the dimensionless numeric multiplying factor. This excludes polynomials of more than one term or transcendental functions not of that form.

Scalar arguments to transcendental functions such as exponential, trigonometric and logarithmic functions, or to inhomogeneous polynomials, must be dimensionless quantities. (Note: this requirement is somewhat relaxed in Siano's orientational analysis described below, in which the square of certain dimensioned quantities are dimensionless.)

While most mathematical identities about dimensionless numbers translate in a straightforward manner to dimensional quantities, care must be taken with logarithms of ratios: the identity log(a/b) = log a − log b, where the logarithm is taken in any base, holds for dimensionless numbers a and b, but it does not hold if a and b are dimensional, because in this case the left-hand side is well-defined but the right-hand side is not.

Similarly, while one can evaluate monomials (x^{n}) of dimensional quantities, one cannot evaluate polynomials of mixed degree with dimensionless coefficients on dimensional quantities: for x^{2}, the expression (3 m)^{2} = 9 m^{2} makes sense (as an area), while for x^{2} + x, the expression (3 m)^{2} + 3 m = 9 m^{2} + 3 m does not make sense.

However, polynomials of mixed degree can make sense if the coefficients are suitably chosen physical quantities that are not dimensionless. For example,
$$\tfrac{1}{2} \cdot (\mathrm{-9.8~m/s^2}) \cdot t^2 + (\mathrm{500~m/s}) \cdot t.$$

This is the height to which an object rises in time t if the acceleration of gravity is 9.8 metres per second per second and the initial upward speed is 500 metres per second. It is not necessary for t to be in seconds. For example, suppose t = 0.01 minutes. Then the first term would be
$$\begin{align}
&\tfrac{1}{2} \cdot (\mathrm{-9.8~m/s^2}) \cdot (\mathrm{0.01~min})^2 \\[10pt]
={} &\tfrac{1}{2} \cdot -9.8 \cdot \left(0.01^2\right) (\mathrm{min/s})^2 \cdot \mathrm{m} \\[10pt]
={} &\tfrac{1}{2} \cdot -9.8 \cdot \left(0.01^2\right) \cdot 60^2 \cdot \mathrm{m}.
\end{align}$$

=== Combining units and numerical values ===
The value of a dimensional physical quantity Z is written as the product of a unit [Z] within the dimension and a dimensionless numerical value or numerical factor, n.
$$Z = n \times [Z] = n [Z]$$

When like-dimensioned quantities are added or subtracted or compared, it is convenient to express them in the same unit so that the numerical values of these quantities may be directly added or subtracted. But, in concept, there is no problem adding quantities of the same dimension expressed in different units. For example, 1 metre added to 1 foot is a length, but one cannot derive that length by simply adding 1 and 1. A conversion factor, which is a ratio of like-dimensioned quantities and is equal to the dimensionless unity, is needed:
$$\mathrm{1\,ft} = \mathrm{0.3048\,m} ~~\text{ is identical to }~~ 1 = \frac{\mathrm{0.3048\,m}}{\mathrm{1\,ft}}.$$

The factor 0.3048 m/ft is identical to the dimensionless 1, so multiplying by this conversion factor changes nothing. Then when adding two quantities of like dimension, but expressed in different units, the appropriate conversion factor, which is essentially the dimensionless 1, is used to convert the quantities to the same unit so that their numerical values can be added or subtracted.

Only in this manner is it meaningful to speak of adding like-dimensioned quantities of differing units.

=== Quantity equations ===
A quantity equation, also sometimes called a complete equation, is an equation that remains valid independently of the unit of measurement used when expressing the physical quantities.

In contrast, in a numerical-value equation, just the numerical values of the quantities occur, without units. Therefore, it is only valid when each numerical values is referenced to a specific unit.

For example, a quantity equation for displacement d as speed s multiplied by time difference t would be:

d = s t

for s = 5 m/s, where t and d may be expressed in any units, converted if necessary. In contrast, a corresponding numerical-value equation would be:

D = 5 T

where T is the numeric value of t when expressed in seconds and D is the numeric value of d when expressed in metres.

Generally, the use of numerical-value equations is discouraged.

== Dimensionless concepts ==
=== Constants ===
The dimensionless constants that arise in the results obtained, such as the C in the Poiseuille's Law problem and the κ in the spring problems discussed above, come from a more detailed analysis of the underlying physics and often arise from integrating some differential equation. Dimensional analysis itself has little to say about these constants, but it is useful to know that they very often have a magnitude of order unity. This observation can allow one to sometimes make "back of the envelope" calculations about the phenomenon of interest, and therefore be able to more efficiently design experiments to measure it, or to judge whether it is important, etc.

=== Formalisms ===
Paradoxically, dimensional analysis can be a useful tool even if all the parameters in the underlying theory are dimensionless, e.g., lattice models such as the Ising model can be used to study phase transitions and critical phenomena. Such models can be formulated in a purely dimensionless way. As we approach the critical point closer and closer, the distance over which the variables in the lattice model are correlated (the so-called correlation length, χ) becomes larger and larger. Now, the correlation length is the relevant length scale related to critical phenomena, so one can, e.g., surmise on "dimensional grounds" that the non-analytical part of the free energy per lattice site should be ~ 1/χ^{d}, where d is the dimension of the lattice.

It has been argued by some physicists, e.g., Michael J. Duff, that the laws of physics are inherently dimensionless. The fact that we have assigned incompatible dimensions to Length, Time and Mass is, according to this point of view, just a matter of convention, borne out of the fact that before the advent of modern physics, there was no way to relate mass, length, and time to each other. The three independent dimensionful constants: c, ħ, and G, in the fundamental equations of physics must then be seen as mere conversion factors to convert Mass, Time and Length into each other.

Just as in the case of critical properties of lattice models, one can recover the results of dimensional analysis in the appropriate scaling limit; e.g., dimensional analysis in mechanics can be derived by reinserting the constants ħ, c, and G (but we can now consider them to be dimensionless) and demanding that a nonsingular relation between quantities exists in the limit c → ∞, ħ → 0 and G → 0. In problems involving a gravitational field the latter limit should be taken such that the field stays finite.

== Dimensional equivalences ==
Following are tables of commonly occurring expressions in physics, related to the dimensions of energy, momentum, and force.

Energy, E (T^{−2}L^{2}M)	Expression	Nomenclature
Mechanical	$W=Fd$	W = work, F = force, d = distance
Mechanical	$S/t \equiv Pt$	S = action, t = time, P = power
Mechanical	$mv^2 \equiv pv \equiv p^2/m$	m = mass, v = velocity, p = momentum
Mechanical	$I\omega^2 \equiv L\omega \equiv L^2/I$	L = angular momentum, I = moment of inertia, ω = angular velocity
Ideal gases	$p V \equiv NT$	p = pressure, V = volume, T = temperature, N = amount of substance
Waves	$AIt \equiv ASt$	A = area of wave front, I = wave intensity, t = time, S = Poynting vector
Electromagnetic	$q\phi$	q = electric charge, ϕ = electric potential (for changes this is voltage)
Electromagnetic	$\varepsilon E^2V \equiv B^2V/\mu$	E = electric field, B = magnetic field, ε = permittivity, μ = permeability, V = 3d volume
Electromagnetic	$pE \equiv m B \equiv I A B$	p = electric dipole moment, m = magnetic moment, A = area (bounded by a current loop), I = electric current in loop

Momentum, p (T^{−1}LM)	Expression	Nomenclature
Mechanical	$mv \equiv Ft$	m = mass, v = velocity, F = force, t = time
Mechanical	$S/r \equiv L/r$	S = action, L = angular momentum, r = displacement
Thermal	$m \sqrt{\left\langle v^2 \right\rangle}$	$\sqrt{\left\langle v^2 \right\rangle}$ = root mean square velocity, m = mass (of a molecule)
Waves	$\rho V v$	ρ = density, V = volume, v = phase velocity
Electromagnetic	$q A$	A = magnetic vector potential

Force, F (T^{−2}LM)	Expression	Nomenclature
Mechanical	$ma \equiv p/t$	m = mass, a = acceleration
Thermal	$T \delta S/\delta r$	S = entropy, T = temperature, r = displacement (see entropic force)
Electromagnetic	$Eq \equiv Bqv$	E = electric field, B = magnetic field, v = velocity, q = charge

== Programming languages ==
Dimensional correctness as part of type checking has been studied since 1977. Implementations for Ada and C++ were described in 1985 and 1988. Kennedy's 1996 thesis describes an implementation in Standard ML, and later in F#. There are implementations for Haskell, OCaml, and Rust, Python, and a code checker for Fortran.
Griffioen's 2019 thesis extended Kennedy's Hindley–Milner type system to support Hart's matrices. McBride and Nordvall-Forsberg show how to use dependent types to extend type systems for units of measure.

Mathematica 13.2 has a function for transformations with quantities named NondimensionalizationTransform that applies a nondimensionalization transform to an equation. Mathematica also has a function to find the dimensions of a unit such as 1 J named UnitDimensions. Mathematica also has a function that will find dimensionally equivalent combinations of a subset of physical quantities named DimensionalCombinations. Mathematica can also factor out certain dimensions with UnitDimensions by specifying an argument to the function UnityDimensions. For example, you can use UnityDimensions to factor out angles. In addition to UnitDimensions, Mathematica can find the dimensions of a QuantityVariable with the function QuantityVariableDimensions.

== Geometry: position vs. displacement ==
=== Affine quantities ===
Some discussions of dimensional analysis implicitly describe all quantities as mathematical vectors, but this is not the case. Numbers are often used to represent things that are not elements of vector spaces, and dimensional analysis should not be applied to such things. In physics, while scalars are positive (or in certain cases, possibly negative) quantities like weight or distance with magnitude but not direction, vectors can be added to or subtracted from other vectors, and multiplied or divided by scalars. If a vector is used to define a position, this assumes an implicit point of reference: an origin. While this is useful and often perfectly adequate, allowing many important errors to be caught, it can fail to model certain aspects of physics. A more rigorous approach requires distinguishing position from displacement, date from duration, bearing from angle, and absolute temperature from temperature change.

Consider points on a timeline, each with a date with respect to a given origin, and durations of between them. The dates themselves are labels of points, while the durations of time between points have a dimension of time:

- adding two durations should yield a new duration (waiting ten days then twenty days gets you thirty days forward),
- adding a duration to a date should yield a new date (Waiting one month from March 1st, 1900 take you to April 1st.),
- subtracting two dates should yield a duration,
- but one may not add two dates (Adding March 1st to April 1st does not make sense.)

This illustrates the subtle type-distinction between affine values (elements of an affine space, such as date) and vector values (elements of a vector space, such as duration).

- Vectors may be added to each other, yielding a new vector, and a vector may be added to a suitable affine quantity (a vector space acts on an affine space), yielding a new affine quantity.
- Affine quantities cannot be added, but may be subtracted, yielding relative quantities which are vectors, and these relative differences may then be added to each other or to an affine quantity.

Properly then dates and positions are not dimensional quantities but affine quantities. Durations and displacements are dimensional quantities. To represent dimensional quantities with numbers, one must only select a reference unit. To represent affine quantities like date and position in terms of dimensional quantity, one must also select a point of reference and coordinate system in addition to the reference unit.

While some quantities are well-represented by vector quantities to which dimensional analysis can be applied, others are more naturally represented in an affine space, and still others like bearings and probabilities are elements of other spaces.

This distinction is particularly important in the case of temperature, for which the numeric value of absolute zero is not the origin 0 in some scales. For absolute zero,

−273.15 °C ≘ 0 K = 0 °R ≘ −459.67 °F,

where the symbol ≘ means corresponds to, since although these values on the respective temperature scales correspond, they represent distinct quantities in the same way that the distances from distinct starting points to the same end point are distinct quantities, and cannot in general be equated.

For temperature differences,

1 K = 1 °C ≠ 1 °F = 1 °R.

(Here °R refers to the Rankine scale, not the Réaumur scale). Unit conversion for temperature differences is simply a matter of multiplying by, e.g., 1 °F / 1 K. But because some of these scales have origins that do not correspond to absolute zero, conversion from one temperature scale to another requires accounting for that. As a result, simple dimensional analysis can lead to errors if it is ambiguous whether 1 K means the absolute temperature corresponding to the Celsius temperature −272.15 °C, or a temperature difference equal to 1 °C.

=== Orientation and frame of reference ===
Similar to the issue of a point of reference is the issue of orientation: a displacement in 2 or 3 dimensions is not just a length, but is a length together with a direction. (In 1 dimension, this issue is equivalent to the distinction between positive and negative.) Thus, to compare or combine two dimensional quantities in multi-dimensional Euclidean space, one also needs a bearing: they need to be compared to a frame of reference.

This leads to the extensions discussed below, namely Huntley's directed dimensions and Siano's orientational analysis.

=== Huntley's extensions ===
Huntley has pointed out that a dimensional analysis can become more powerful by discovering new independent dimensions in the quantities under consideration, thus increasing the rank $m$ of the dimensional matrix.

He introduced two approaches:

- The magnitudes of the components of a vector are to be considered dimensionally independent. For example, rather than an undifferentiated length dimension L, we may have L_{x} represent dimension in the x-direction, and so forth. This requirement stems ultimately from the requirement that each component of a physically meaningful equation (scalar, vector, or tensor) must be dimensionally consistent.
- Mass as a measure of the quantity of matter is to be considered dimensionally independent from mass as a measure of inertia.

==== Directed dimensions ====
As an example of the usefulness of the first approach, suppose we wish to calculate the distance a cannonball travels when fired with a vertical velocity component $v_\text{y}$ and a horizontal velocity component $v_\text{x}$, assuming it is fired on a flat surface. Assuming no use of directed lengths, the quantities of interest are then R, the distance travelled, with dimension L, $v_\text{x}$, $v_\text{y}$, both dimensioned as T^{−1}L, and g the downward acceleration of gravity, with dimension T^{−2}L.

With these four quantities, we may conclude that the equation for the range R may be written:
$$R \propto v_\text{x}^a\,v_\text{y}^b\,g^c .$$

Or dimensionally
$$\mathsf{L} = \left(\mathsf{T}^{-1}\mathsf{L}\right)^{a+b} \left(\mathsf{T}^{-2}\mathsf{L}\right)^c$$
from which we may deduce that $a + b + c = 1$ and $a + b + 2c = 0$, which leaves one exponent undetermined. This is to be expected since we have two fundamental dimensions T and L, and four parameters, with one equation.

However, if we use directed length dimensions, then $v_\mathrm{x}$ will be dimensioned as T^{−1}L_{x}, $v_\mathrm{y}$ as T^{−1}L_{y}, R as L_{x} and g as T^{−2}L_{y}. The dimensional equation becomes:
$$\mathsf{L}_\mathrm{x} =
\left({\mathsf{T}^{-1}}{\mathsf{L}_\mathrm{x}}\right)^a
\left({\mathsf{T}^{-1}}{\mathsf{L}_\mathrm{y}}\right)^b
\left({\mathsf{T}^{-2}}{\mathsf{L}_\mathrm{y}}\right)^c$$
and we may solve completely as a = 1, b = 1 and c = −1. The increase in deductive power gained by the use of directed length dimensions is apparent.

Huntley's concept of directed length dimensions however has some serious limitations:

- It does not deal well with vector equations involving the cross product,
- nor does it handle well the use of angles as physical variables.

It also is often quite difficult to assign the L, L_{x}, L_{y}, L_{z}, symbols to the physical variables involved in the problem of interest. He invokes a procedure that involves the "symmetry" of the physical problem. This is often very difficult to apply reliably: It is unclear as to what parts of the problem that the notion of "symmetry" is being invoked. Is it the symmetry of the physical body that forces are acting upon, or to the points, lines or areas at which forces are being applied? What if more than one body is involved with different symmetries?

Consider the spherical bubble attached to a cylindrical tube, where one wants the flow rate of air as a function of the pressure difference in the two parts. What are the Huntley extended dimensions of the viscosity of the air contained in the connected parts? What are the extended dimensions of the pressure of the two parts? Are they the same or different? These difficulties are responsible for the limited application of Huntley's directed length dimensions to real problems.

==== Quantity of matter ====
In Huntley's second approach, he holds that it is sometimes useful (e.g., in fluid mechanics and thermodynamics) to distinguish between mass as a measure of inertia (inertial mass), and mass as a measure of the quantity of matter. Quantity of matter is defined by Huntley as a quantity only proportional to inertial mass, while not implicating inertial properties. No further restrictions are added to its definition.

For example, consider the derivation of Poiseuille's Law. We wish to find the rate of mass flow of a viscous fluid through a circular pipe. Without drawing distinctions between inertial and substantial mass, we may choose as the relevant variables:

Symbol	Variable	Dimension
$\dot{m}$	mass flow rate	T^{−1}M
$p_\text{x}$	pressure gradient along the pipe	T^{−2}L^{−2}M
ρ	density	L^{−3}M
η	dynamic fluid viscosity	T^{−1}L^{−1}M
r	radius of the pipe	L

There are three fundamental variables, so the above five equations will yield two independent dimensionless variables:
$$\pi_1 = \frac{\dot{m}}{\eta r}$$
$$\pi_2 = \frac{p_\mathrm{x}\rho r^5}{\dot{m}^2}$$

If we distinguish between inertial mass with dimension $M_\text{i}$ and quantity of matter with dimension $M_\text{m}$, then mass flow rate and density will use quantity of matter as the mass parameter, while the pressure gradient and coefficient of viscosity will use inertial mass. We now have four fundamental parameters, and one dimensionless constant, so that the dimensional equation may be written:
$$C = \frac{p_\mathrm{x}\rho r^4}{\eta \dot{m}}$$

where now only C is an undetermined constant (found to be equal to $\pi/8$ by methods outside of dimensional analysis). This equation may be solved for the mass flow rate to yield Poiseuille's law.

Huntley's recognition of quantity of matter as an independent quantity dimension is evidently successful in the problems where it is applicable, but his definition of quantity of matter is open to interpretation, as it lacks specificity beyond the two requirements he postulated for it. For a given substance, the SI dimension amount of substance, with unit mole, does satisfy Huntley's two requirements as a measure of quantity of matter, and could be used as a quantity of matter in any problem of dimensional analysis where Huntley's concept is applicable.

=== Siano's extension: orientational analysis ===
Angles are, by convention, considered to be dimensionless quantities (although the wisdom of this is contested). As an example, consider again the projectile problem in which a point mass is launched from the origin (x, y) = (0, 0) at a speed v and angle θ above the x-axis, with the force of gravity directed along the negative y-axis. It is desired to find the range R, at which point the mass returns to the x-axis. Conventional analysis will yield the dimensionless variable π = R g/v^{2}, but offers no insight into the relationship between R and θ.

Siano has suggested that the directed dimensions of Huntley be replaced by using orientational symbols 1_{x} 1_{y} 1_{z} to denote vector directions, and an orientationless symbol 1_{0}. Thus, Huntley's L_{x} becomes L1_{x} with L specifying the dimension of length, and 1_{x} specifying the orientation. Siano further shows that the orientational symbols have an algebra of their own. Along with the requirement that 1_{i}^{−1} = 1_{i}, the following multiplication table for the orientation symbols results:

	$\mathbf{1_0}$	$\mathbf{1_\text{x}}$	$\mathbf{1_\text{y}}$	$\mathbf{1_\text{z}}$
$\mathbf{1_0}$	$1_0$	$1_\text{x}$	$1_\text{y}$	$1_\text{z}$
$\mathbf{1_\text{x}}$	$1_\text{x}$	$1_0$	$1_\text{z}$	$1_\text{y}$
$\mathbf{1_\text{y}}$	$1_\text{y}$	$1_\text{z}$	$1_0$	$1_\text{x}$
$\mathbf{1_\text{z}}$	$1_\text{z}$	$1_\text{y}$	$1_\text{x}$	$1_0$

The orientational symbols form a group (the Klein four-group or "Viergruppe"). In this system, scalars always have the same orientation as the identity element, independent of the "symmetry of the problem". Physical quantities that are vectors have the orientation expected: a force or a velocity in the z-direction has the orientation of 1_{z}. For angles, consider an angle θ that lies in the z-plane. Form a right triangle in the z-plane with θ being one of the acute angles. The side of the right triangle adjacent to the angle then has an orientation 1_{x} and the side opposite has an orientation 1_{y}. Since (using ~ to indicate orientational equivalence) tan(θ) = θ + ... ~ 1_{y}/1_{x} we conclude that an angle in the xy-plane must have an orientation 1_{y}/1_{x} = 1_{z}, which is not unreasonable. Analogous reasoning forces the conclusion that sin(θ) has orientation 1_{z} while cos(θ) has orientation 1_{0}. These are different, so one concludes (correctly), for example, that there are no solutions of physical equations that are of the form a cos(θ) + b sin(θ), where a and b are real scalars. An expression such as $\sin(\theta+\pi/2)=\cos(\theta)$ is not dimensionally inconsistent since it is a special case of the sum of angles formula and should properly be written:
$$\sin\left(a\,1_\text{z} + b\,1_\text{z}\right) =
\sin\left(a\,1_\text{z}) \cos(b\,1_\text{z}\right) +
\sin\left(b\,1_\text{z}) \cos(a\,1_\text{z}\right),$$
which for $a = \theta$ and $b = \pi/2$ yields $\sin(\theta\,1_\text{z} + [\pi/2]\,1_\text{z}) = 1_\text{z}\cos(\theta\,1_\text{z})$. Siano distinguishes between geometric angles, which have an orientation in 3-dimensional space, and phase angles associated with time-based oscillations, which have no spatial orientation, i.e. the orientation of a phase angle is $1_0$.

The assignment of orientational symbols to physical quantities and the requirement that physical equations be orientationally homogeneous can actually be used in a way that is similar to dimensional analysis to derive more information about acceptable solutions of physical problems. In this approach, one solves the dimensional equation as far as one can. If the lowest power of a physical variable is fractional, both sides of the solution is raised to a power such that all powers are integral, putting it into normal form. The orientational equation is then solved to give a more restrictive condition on the unknown powers of the orientational symbols. The solution is then more complete than the one that dimensional analysis alone gives. Often, the added information is that one of the powers of a certain variable is even or odd.

As an example, for the projectile problem, using orientational symbols, θ, being in the xy-plane will thus have dimension 1_{z} and the range of the projectile R will be of the form:
$$R = g^a\,v^b\,\theta^c\text{ which means }\mathsf{L}\,1_\mathrm{x} \sim
\left(\frac{\mathsf{L}\,1_\text{y}}{\mathsf{T}^2}\right)^a \left(\frac{\mathsf{L}}{\mathsf{T}}\right)^b\,1_\mathsf{z}^c.\,$$

Dimensional homogeneity will now correctly yield a = −1 and b = 2, and orientational homogeneity requires that $1_x /(1_y^a 1_z^c)=1_z^{c+1} = 1$. In other words, that c must be an odd integer. In fact, the required function of theta will be sin(θ)cos(θ) which is a series consisting of odd powers of θ.

It is seen that the Taylor series of sin(θ) and cos(θ) are orientationally homogeneous using the above multiplication table, while expressions like cos(θ) + sin(θ) and exp(θ) are not, and are (correctly) deemed unphysical.

Siano's orientational analysis is compatible with the conventional conception of angular quantities as being dimensionless, and within orientational analysis, the radian may still be considered a dimensionless unit. The orientational analysis of a quantity equation is carried out separately from the ordinary dimensional analysis, yielding information that supplements the dimensional analysis.

== See also ==
- Buckingham π theorem
- Dimensionless numbers in fluid mechanics
- Fermi estimate – used to teach dimensional analysis
- Numerical-value equation
- Rayleigh's method of dimensional analysis
- Similitude – an application of dimensional analysis
- System of measurement

=== Related areas of mathematics ===
- Covariance and contravariance of vectors
- Exterior algebra
- Geometric algebra
- Quantity calculus

== Notes ==
Quantity			SI unit	
Name	Symbol	Dimension symbol	Unit name	Unit symbol
time, duration	t	T	second	s
length	l, x, r, etc.	L	metre	m
mass	m	M	kilogram	kg
electric current	I , i	I	ampere	A
thermodynamic temperature	T	Θ	kelvin	K
amount of substance	n	N	mole	mol
luminous intensity	I_{v}	J	candela	cd
