= 4C 58.17 =

Quasar located in the constellation Ursa Major

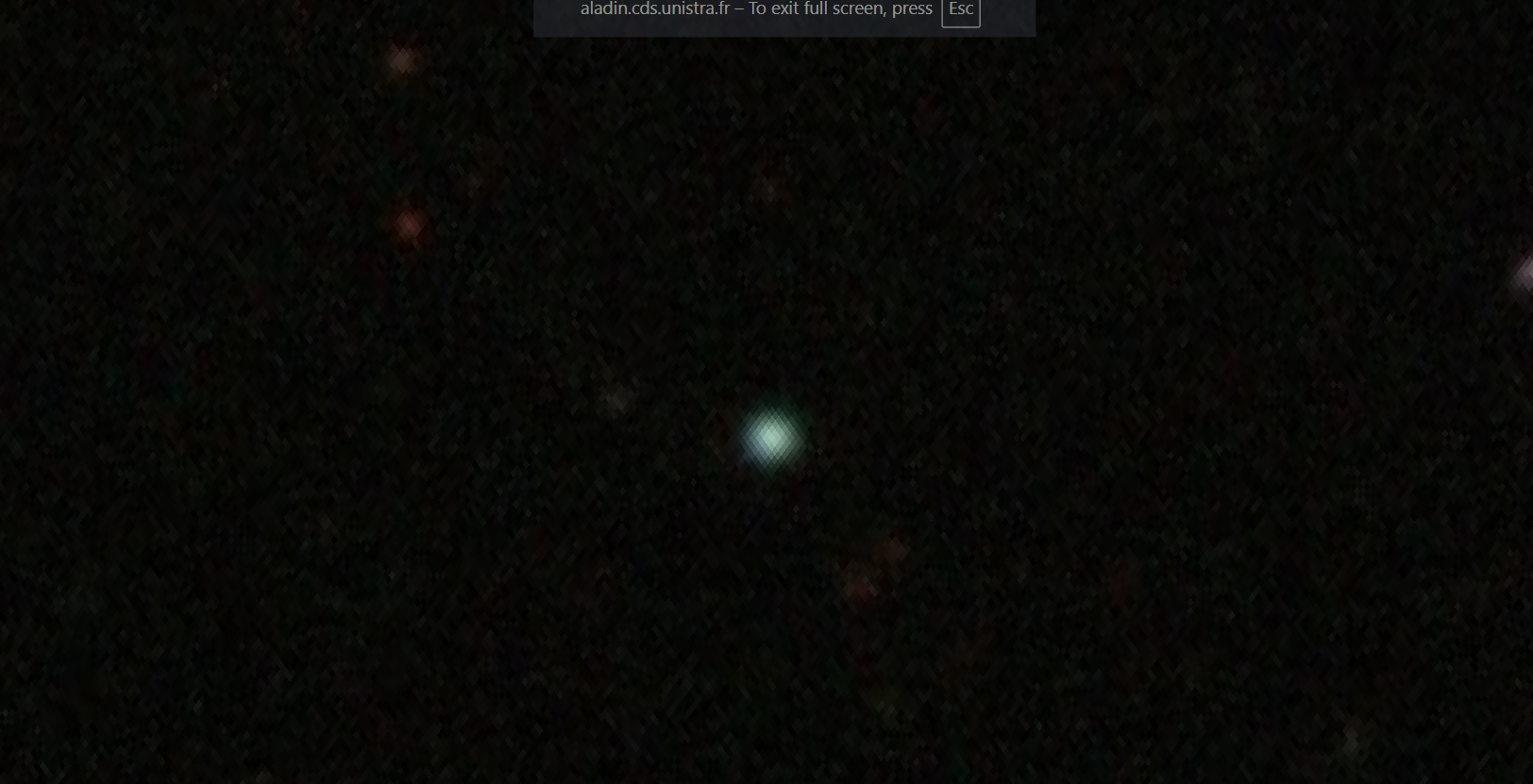
- SDSS image of 4C 58.17

Observation data (J2000.0 epoch)
- Constellation: Ursa Major
- Right ascension: 08^{h} 54^{m} 41.99^{s}
- Declination: +57° 57′ 29.93″
- Redshift: 1.317368
- Heliocentric radial velocity: 394,937 km/s
- Distance: 9.036 Gly
- Apparent magnitude (V): 18.18
- Apparent magnitude (B): 18.56

Characteristics
- Type: LPQ FSRQ
- Size: ~215,000 ly (65.8 kpc) (estimated)
- Notable features: superluminal quasar

Other designations
- SDSS J085442.00+575729.9, LEDA 2821457, NVSS J085441+575729, VLSS J0854.7+5757, 6C B085050.2+580854, S4 0850+58, VIPS 163, RX J0854.6+5757, 2CXO J085442.0+575730

4C 58.17 also known as 0850+581, is a quasar located in the northern constellation of Ursa Major. The redshift of the object is (z) 1.317 estimating a light-travel time distance of 9 billion light years away from Earth and was first discovered as an astronomical radio source by astronomers in 1981. It is a flat-spectrum radio quasar and a superluminal source.

== Description ==
4C 58.17 has a compact triple radio structure. When imaged with Very Long Baseline Interferometry (VLBI), it is shown to have a core-jet morphology that is typical of powerful observed quasars, being mainly dominated by strong nuclear radio emission with a bright radio core and a secondary component present at a position angle of 170° with its distance being 4.5 milliarcseconds away. New VLBI and Very Large Array (VLA) observations showed there is a northern component on mas-scale, several secondary components and a weak resolved feature present in the quasar. This northern component is estimated to hold 85% of the flux density.

A study published in 1986 found 4C 58.17 has superluminal motion in its core. Based on studies, the core of the source is found to be expanding at a speed of 5.3 ± 0.8 per hour with its components separation increasing while the position angle of the components decreases per year. A new component has emerged close to the core position, described as elongated along the position angle of 174 ± 4°. The core itself is variable at slight frequencies with a fairly steep spectrum of between 15 and 5 GHz. It is suggested the core might also be shifting by one milliarcsecond between 2 and 8 GHz.

The jet travelling from the core region towards a southeast hotspot on arcsecond scales in 4C 58.17 is described as both curved and knotty, and also displaying a cork-screw behavior. When imaged by the Very Long Baseline Array (VLBA), it takes the form of a two-sided jet moving at relativistic speeds with a counter-jet feature displaying diffused radio emission. There is a noted switch in its orientation, indicating it might be interacting with the surround interstellar medium. The Faraday rotation polarization located downstream from the core by 2 milliarcseconds shows a negative unit of -1612 ± 102 rad/m^{2,} before rising to 270 ± 70 rad/m^{2} upon reaching 3.5 milliarcseconds. A supermassive black hole mass of 8.49 M_{☉} has been estimated for this quasar.
