= Vladimir Varićak =

Croatian Serb mathematician and theoretical physicist

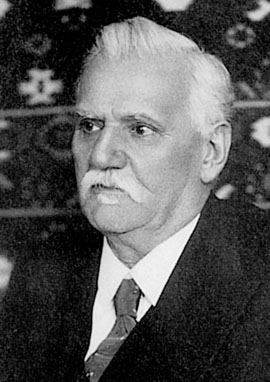
- Born: 1 March 1865; Otočac, Austrian Empire
- Died: 17 January 1942 (aged 76); Zagreb, NDH
- Occupations: mathematician physicist
- Known for: Rapidity
- Awards: ICM Speaker (1908, 1928)

Vladimir Varićak (sometimes also spelled Vladimir Varičak; March 1, 1865 – January 17, 1942) was a Croatian Serb mathematician and theoretical physicist.

== Biography ==
Varićak, an ethnic Serb, was born on March 1, 1865, in the village of Švica near Otočac, Austrian Empire (present-day Croatia). He studied physics and mathematics at the University of Zagreb from 1883 to 1887. He made his PhD in 1889 and got his habilitation in 1895. In 1899 he became professor of mathematics in Zagreb, where he gave lectures until his death in 1942.

From 1903 to 1908 he wrote on hyperbolic geometry (or Bolyai–Lobachevskian geometry). In 1910, following a 1909 publication of Sommerfeld, he applied hyperbolic geometry to the special theory of relativity. Sommerfeld, using the imaginary form of Minkowski space, had shown in his 1909 paper that the Einstein formula for combination of velocities is most clearly understandable as a formula for triangular addition on the surface of a sphere of imaginary radius. Varićak reinterpreted this result as showing that rapidity combines by the triangle rule in hyperbolic space. This is a fundamental result for the hyperbolic theory which was demonstrated later by other approaches by Robb (1911) and Borel (1913). The 1910 papers also dealt with several applications of the hyperbolic theory to optics. In 1911 Varićak was invited to speak to the Deutsche Mathematiker-Vereinigung in Karlsruhe on his work. He continued to develop the hyperbolic reinterpretation of Einstein's theory collecting his results in 1924 in a textbook, Darstellung der Relativitätstheorie im drei-dimensionalen Lobatschefskijschen Raume (Relativity in Three-Dimensional Lobachevski Space), now available in English. In the period 1909 to 1913 Varićak had correspondence with Albert Einstein concerning rotation and length contraction where Varićak's interpretations differed from those of Einstein. Concerning length contraction Varićak said that in Einstein's interpretation the contraction is only an "apparent" or a "psychological" phenomenon due to the convention of clock measurements whereas in the Lorentz theory it was an objective phenomenon. Einstein published a brief rebuttal, saying that his interpretation of the contraction was closer to Lorentz's.

Walter (1999) re-examined Minkowski's non-Euclidean geometry. He begins by analysis of "the tip of a four-dimensional velocity vector" and notes Minkowski's equations where "both hypersurfaces provide a basis for a well-known model of non-Euclidean space of constant negative curvature, popularized by Helmholtz." In fact it is known as the hyperboloid model of hyperbolic geometry.

Walter goes on to say:

More than any other mathematician, Varićak devoted himself to the development of the non-euclidean style [of relativity], unfolding Minkowski's image of velocity-vector relations in hyperbolic space, and recapitulating a variety of results in terms of hyperbolic functions. The use of hyperbolic trigonometry was shown by Varićak to entail significant notational advantages. For example, he relayed the interpretation put forth by Hergloz and Klein of the Lorentz transformation as a displacement in hyperbolic space, and indicated simple expressions for proper time and the aberration of light in terms of a hyperbolic argument.

Varićak is also known as a high school teacher of Milutin Milanković and of Mileva Marić, the first wife of Einstein, and as a university instructor of Đuro Kurepa.

Varićak made scholarly contributions on the life and work of Ruđer Bošković (1711–1787) These are listed in the biography of Kurepa (1965) cited below. Of special interest for the history of relativity is that Varićak also edited and published a little-known 1755 paper of Boscovich in Latin entitled "On absolute motion – if it is possible to distinguish it from relative motion" ("Of Space and Time"). Varićak said that the paper "contains many remarkably clear and radical ideas regarding the relativity of space, time and motion."

Although having a Serbian origin and being an Orthodox and later Greek Catholic, he disputed and dismissed the thesis that Ruđer Bošković was a Serb.

He was a member of the Yugoslav Academy of Sciences and Arts, the Czech Academy of Sciences, the Serbian Academy of Sciences and Arts, the Croatian Society for Natural Science, and the Yugoslav Mathematical Society.

== See also ==
- Ehrenfest paradox

== Publications ==
- Varićak, V. (1903), "Bemerkung zu einem Punkte in der Festrede L. Schlesingers über Johann Bolyai", Jahresbericht der Deutschen Mathematiker-Vereinigung (in German), 12: 165–194
- Varićak, V. (1908), "Beiträge zur nichteuklidischen Geometrie", Jahresbericht der Deutschen Mathematiker-Vereinigung, 17: 70–83
- Varićak, V. (1908) "Zur nichteuklidischen analytischen Geometrie", Proceedings of the International Congress of Mathematicians, Bd. II, SS. 213–26.
- Varićak, V. (1910), "Anwendung der Lobatschefskijschen Geometrie in der Relativtheorie" , Physikalische Zeitschrift, 11: 93–6

- Wikisource translation: Application of Lobachevskian Geometry in the Theory of Relativity

- Varićak, V. (1910), "Die Relativtheorie und die Lobatschefskijsche Geometrie" , Physikalische Zeitschrift, 11: 287–293

- Wikisource translation: The Theory of Relativity and Lobachevskian Geometry

- Varićak, V. (1910), "Die Reflexion des Lichtes an bewegten Spiegeln" , Physikalische Zeitschrift, 11: 586–587

- Wikisource translation: The Reflection of Light at Moving Mirrors

- Varićak, V. (1911), "Die Interpretation der Relativtheorie in der Lobatschevkijschen Geometrie (Serbian)", Proc. Serb. Acad., 93: 211–255
- Varićak, V. (1911), "Zum Ehrenfestschen Paradoxon" , Physikalische Zeitschrift, 12: 169

- Wikisource translation: On Ehrenfest's Paradox

- Varićak, V. (1912), "Über die nichteuklidische Interpretation der Relativtheorie" , Jahresbericht der Deutschen Mathematiker-Vereinigung, 21: 103–127

- Wikisource translation: On the Non-Euclidean Interpretation of the Theory of Relativity

- Varićak, V. (1914), "Bemerkungen zur Relativtheorie" , Bull. Acad. Zagreb (2): 46–64
- Varićak, V. (1914), "Beitrag zur nichteuklidischen Interpretation der Relativtheorie" , Bull. Acad. Zagreb (3): 46–49
- Varićak, V. (1915), "Über die Transformation des elektromagnetischen Feldes in der Relativtheorie" , Bull. Acad. Zagreb (3): 101–106
- Varićak, V. (1915), "Eine Bemerkung zum Dopplerschen Effekt" , Bull. Acad. Zagreb (4): 87–88
- Varićak, V.(1924) Darstellung der Relativitatstheorie im drei=dimensionalen Lobatschefskijschen Raume, Zagreb (Narodni Novini); English translation (2007) Relativity in three dimensional Lobachevski Space, A.F. Kracklauer translator ISBN 1-84753-364-7, at Amazon.com.
- Varićak, V. (1936), "Relativity theory and the Universe", Nature, 137 (3469): 707, Bibcode:1936Natur.137..707V, doi:10.1038/137707b0

A complete list of Varićak's publications on all subjects is given in the following paper:

- Kurepa D. (1965), "First centenary of the birth of mathematician Vladimir Varićak", Informations Scientifiques, Univ.Belgrade (in Serbian): 61–67
