= Proper speed =

Proper speed may refer to:

- Proper velocity
- Proper motion

== See also ==
- Peculiar velocity
