= Larissa Bravina =

Russian and Norwegian physicist

Larissa V. Bravina is a Russian computational particle physicist who works in Norway as a professor of physics at the University of Oslo. Her research applies computational methods to the study of the collisions of heavy ions at relativistic speeds.

== Education and career ==
Bravina received a master's degree in physics in 1982 from Moscow State University, and continued there for a 1990 Ph.D.

After working as a staff scientist in the Institute for Nuclear Physics of Moscow State University beginning in 1982, she first came to Norway in 1992 as a postdoctoral researcher at the University of Bergen. In the late 1990s she left Moscow again for two visiting positions in Germany, as a Humboldt Fellow at Goethe University Frankfurt and then at the University of Tübingen. She moved to the University of Oslo in 2003.

== Recognition ==
Bravina was elected to Academia Europaea in 2014.
