= Gregory Garibian =

Soviet Armenian physicist (1924–1991)

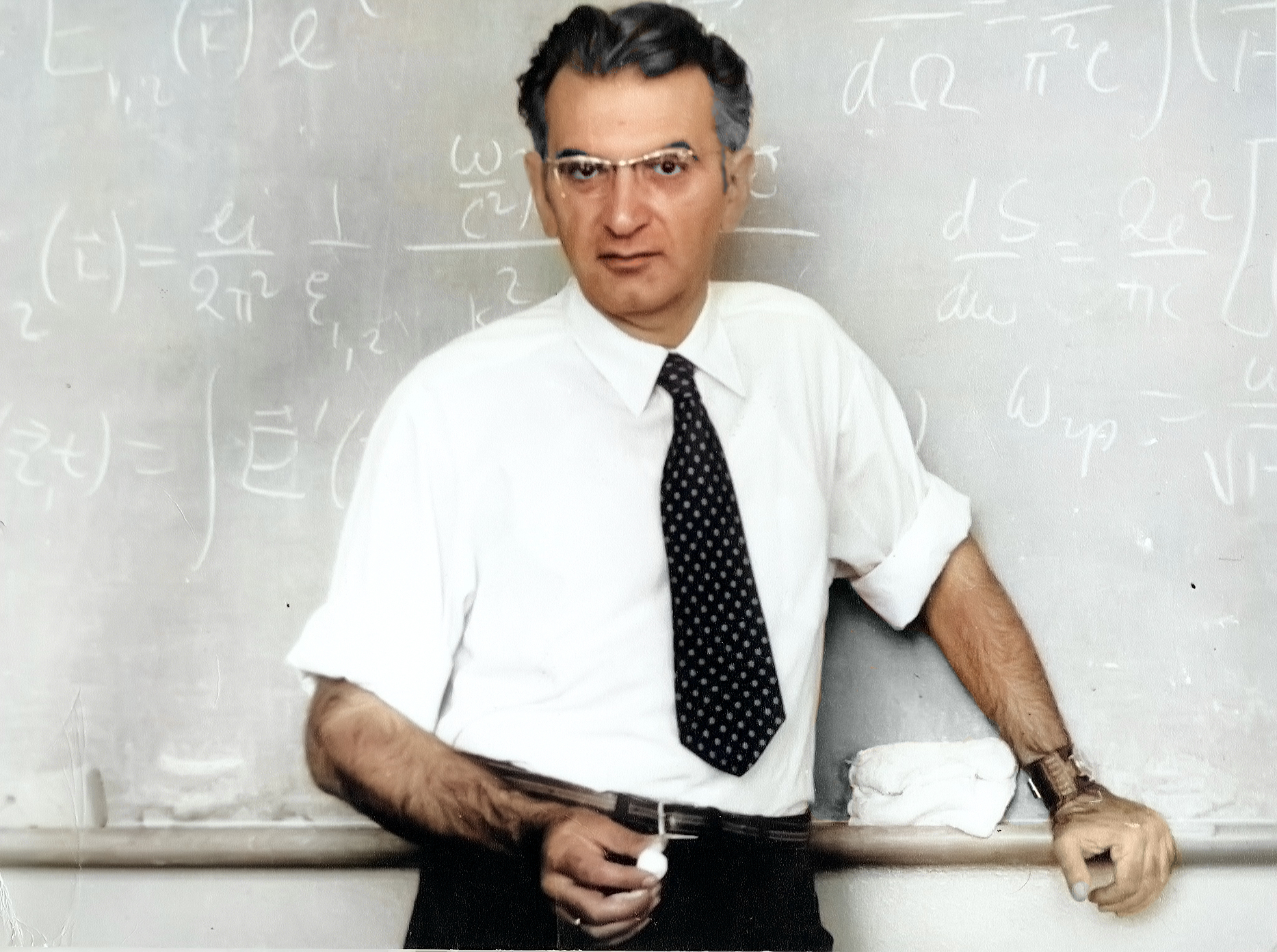
- Born: December 13, 1924; Tbilisi
- Died: June 8, 1991 (aged 66); Yerevan
- Citizenship: USSR
- Education: Moscow State University
- Known for: Development of the Theory of Transition Radiation, TRD
- Awards: Order of Red Banner of Labour 1971 and 1981
- Scientific career
- Fields: physicist
- Workplaces: Yerevan Physics Institute and Armenian Academy of Sciences
- Doctoral advisor: Isaak Pomeranchuk

Gregory Markarovich Garibian (December 13, 1924 – June 8, 1991) was a Soviet Armenian physicist, academician-secretary of the Department of Physics and Mathematics of the Armenian National Academy of Sciences (1973–1991). He is known for developing the Theory of Transition Radiation and showing the feasibility of functional transition radiation detectors (TRDs).

== Biography ==
G.M.Garibian was born in 1924 in Tiflis (now - Tbilisi, Georgia) in a family of a Medical Doctor and a homemaker. Eventually the family moved to Baku (Azerbaijan) where Garibian got his general education. In 1943 he graduated from school in Baku and went to Moscow. Physical science was Garibian's passion in life. Even at a very young age he followed news in the world of physics and was very excited when in 1942 he learned about the Alikhanian brothers’ expedition to Mount Aragats (Armenia) in order to search for protons in cosmic rays. Garibian was accepted into the Department of Physics and Mathematics of Moscow State University which he graduated from in 1948 immediately to leave for Yerevan and join the Yerevan Physics Institute, which was founded by Artyom Alikhanian in 1943. After that time Garibian dedicated himself to scientific research in Theoretical physics, in the fields of Quantum electrodynamics, Cosmic rays, and High energy particles. All his life he worked at the Yerevan Physics Institute consecutively as researcher, scientific secretary of the institute, deputy director and head of laboratory. He actively participated in the creation of the Yerevan Synchrotron and also in the establishment of high-altitude cosmic ray stations on Mount Aragats.

Garibian's main scientific achievement was the discovery of X-Ray Transition Radiation and the development of the Theory of Transition Radiation. He also showed the feasibility of a functional Transition Raditation Detector (TRD) - a tool for identification of high energy ultrarelativistic particles.

In the end of the 1940s and the beginning of the 1950s, the main points of interest of the researchers at the Yerevan Institute of Physics were cosmic rays and the physics of elementary particles. One of the problems bothering experimental physicists working with cosmic rays at that time were measurements of very high energies of the relativistic particles in the cosmic radiation, as with the increase of energy levels of the particles the available methods of registration of their energies were becoming less and less effective.

Garibian tried to develop methods that would help to resolve that problem. As a starting point of his research, he used results published in the article written by Ginzburg and Frank in 1946, where the theoretical existence of transition radiation was predicted. The new type of radiation appearing as a result of charged particle passing through the boundary between two layers of matter. In 1959, Garibyan discovered x-ray transition radiation, the intensity of which had a linear dependence on the Lorentz factor of the particle. Due to this feature, x-ray transition radiation received immediate practical implementation, as it made it possible to identify ultra-relativistic charged particles and to measure their energies.

In following years Garibian with his disciples continued the development of the Theory of Transition Radiation. Their theoretical works stimulated experimental research on transition radiation in Armenia.

In the beginning of the 1960s the first experiment on the registration of TR generated by muons of cosmic rays was conducted on Mount Aragats. The research of TR became more powerful after the Yerevan Synchrotron started its work in 1967. Here, theoretical investigation of TR headed by Garibian was correlated with the experimental research headed by A. Alikhanian. Those studies played a decisive role in prompting similar work throughout the world: in the Brookhaven National Laboratory (by prof. Luke Chia-Liu Yuan), at Stanford Accelerator, and in different research centers of Europe.

During his life Garibian, besides being a scientist, was also an educator: he lectured to students at the Physical Mathematical Department of Yerevan State University from 1951 to 1964 (on the topics of classical and quantum electrodynamics, theory of electrons and theory of relativity) and from 1970 to 1973 (on the topic of the passage of fast particles through matter). In the years 1965-1969 he worked also as a Chief of the Theoretical Department of Institute of Radiophysics and Electronics, Armenian AS. Under his leadership many of his disciples achieved their Doctoral degrees and became prominent scientists. He was also interested in documenting the history of progress of physics in Armenia. One of his papers on this topic was co-authored with physicists Artsimovich, Migdal and Jelepov and was dedicated to the Artyom Alikhanian's 60th birthday. From 1966 Garibian worked also as an Executive Editor of the journal "Proceedings of the Academy of Sciences of the Armenian SSR. Physics ".

In 1983 Garibian, together with his disciple Yang Chi, published a monograph: “X-Ray Transition Radiation” which summarized data collected during years of theoretical and experimental research on transition radiation appearing as a result of fast charged particles passing through the boundary between media.

Garibian died on June 8, 1991, in Yerevan, Armenia.

=== Work at Yerevan Physics Institute ===
- 1948-1951 - Researcher
- 1952-1958 - Scientific Secretary
- 1959-1965 - Scientific Deputy Director
- 1966-1991 - Head of Laboratory of Interaction of Charged Particles with Matter

=== Degrees and Nominations ===
- Candidate of Physical and Mathematical Sciences (1952)
- Doctor of Physical and Mathematical Sciences (1961)
- Corresponding Member of the AS, Armenian SSR (1963)
- Full member of the AS, Armenian SSR (1971)
- Professor (1973)
- Academician-Secretary of Department of Physics and Mathematics of AS, Armenian SSR (1973–1991)

== Awards ==
- Order of the Red Banner of Labour (1971, 1981)

== Publications ==
- Garibian G M, Yang Chi “X- Ray Transition Radiation” Publisher Academy of Sciences of ASSR, Yerevan, 1983
