= François Daviet de Foncenex =

Royal Sardinian Army officer and mathematician (1734–1798)

- Born: 1734; Thonon, Duchy of Savoy
- Died: 1798 (aged 63–64); Casale, Piedmont
- Education: Royal Military Academy of the Theory and Practice of Artillery
- Known for: Dimensional analysis
- Scientific career
- Fields: Mathematics; Politics
- Workplaces: Royal Sardinian Army

François Daviet de Foncenex (1734–1799) was a Royal Sardinian Army officer and mathematician.

== Life and work ==
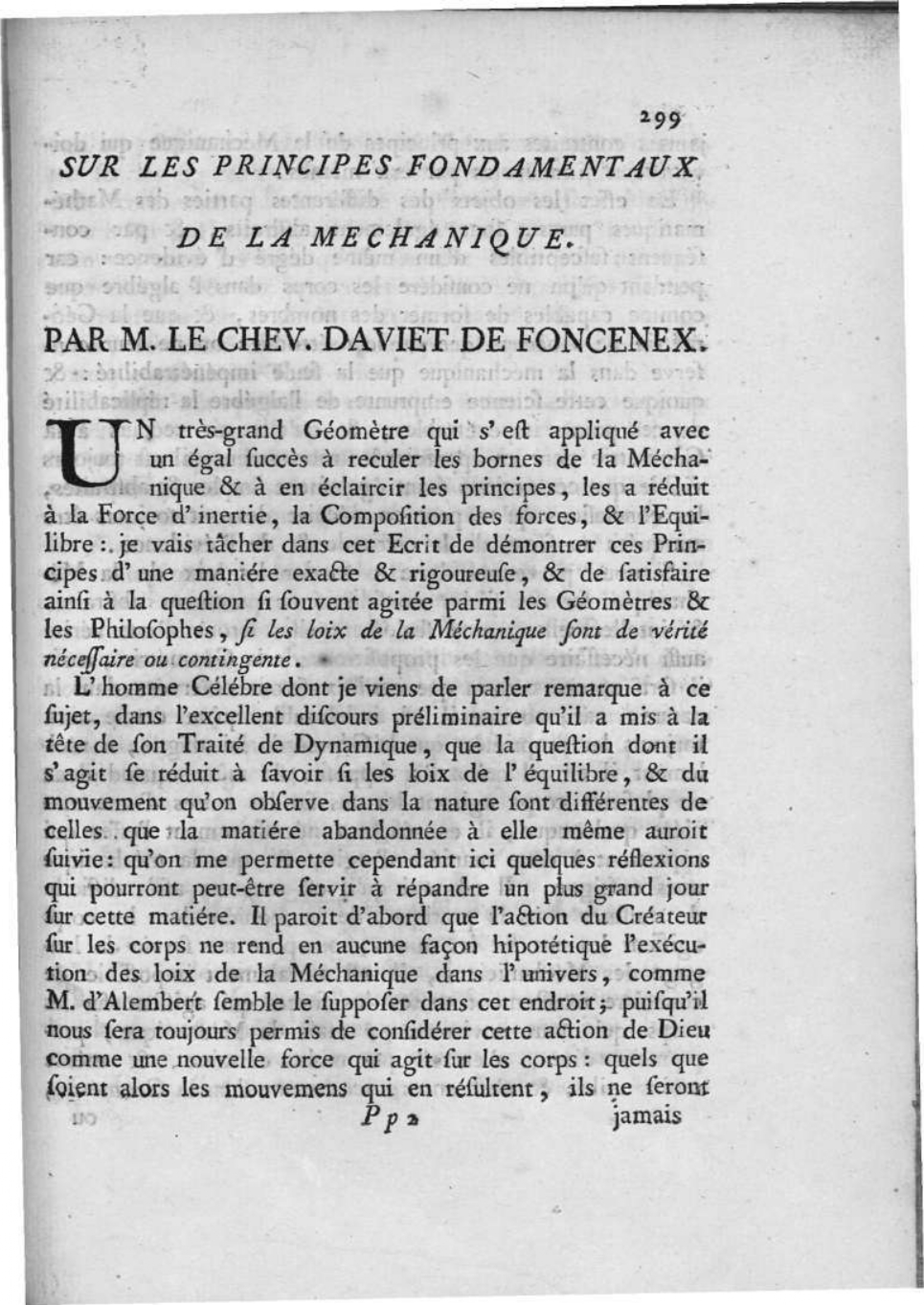
First page of Sur les principes fondamentaux de la méchanique

François Daviet de Foncenex was born in Thonon in the Duchy of Savoy in 1734. He studied in the Accademia di Torino under the professorship of Joseph-Louis Lagrange, who was two years younger than him. In 1759, Daviet was appointed as a member of the Accademia delle Scienze di Torino. He was commissioned as a lieutenant in the Royal Sardinian Army and quickly rose through the ranks. From 1790 to 1792, Daviet served as the governor of Sassari and Villefranche-sur-Mer. In 1792, he fought against the French Revolutionary Army; he was subsequently convicted of treason and sentenced to imprisonment for one year.

Daviet published two important papers in the journal of the Academy, Miscellanea Taurinensis: the first one (1759) about imaginary numbers is titled Mémoire sur les logarithmes des quantités négatives and has an extension titled Éclaircissements sur les quantités imaginaires; more important is the second one, titled Sur les principes fondamentaux de la méchanique (1761). In four sections (law of inertia, composition of forces, equilibrium and law of the lever) he tried to establish the a priori fundamental laws of mechanics.

In 1789 he published a paper: Récit d'une foudre ascendante éclatée sur la tour du fanal de Villefranche. Finally, in 1799, the academy published an ensemble of many of his works, named Principes fondamentaux de la méchanique.

== Bibliography ==
- de Andrade Martins, Roberto (2008). "A busca da Ciência a priori no final do Seculo XVIII e a origem da Análise dimensional". In Roberto de Andrade Martins; Lilian Al-Chueyr Pereira Martins; Cibelle Celestino Silva; Juliana Mesquita Hidalgo Ferreira (eds.). Filosofia E Historia Da Ciência No Cone Sul. 3 Encontro (in Portuguese). AFHIC. ISBN 978-1-4357-1633-9.
- Benvenuto, Edoardo (1991). An Introduction to the History of Structural Mechanics: Part I: Statics and Resistance of Solids. Springer Verlag. ISBN 978-1-4612-7745-3.
- Dhombres, Jean (2006). "Rhétorique et Algèbre au temps des Lumières. La question de la nature des quantités imaginaires selon Euler, Daviet de Foncenex et Laplace" (PDF). Rendiconti Dil Seminario Matematico - Universitá di Torino (in French). 64 (3): 273–298.
