= Transition radiation detector =

A transition radiation detector (TRD) is a particle detector using the Lorentz factor ($\gamma$)-dependent threshold of transition radiation in a stratified material. It contains many layers of materials with different indices of refraction. At each interface between materials, the probability of transition radiation increases with the relativistic gamma factor. Thus, particles with large $\gamma$ give off many photons, and small $\gamma$ give off few. For a given energy, this allows a discrimination between a lighter particle (which has a high $\gamma$ and therefore radiates) and a heavier particle (which has a low $\gamma$ and radiates much less).

The passage of the particle is observed through many thin layers of material put in air or gas. The radiated X-ray photon gives energy deposition by the photoelectric effect, and the signal is detected as ionization. Usually, materials with low atomic number $Z$ are preferred ($Li$, $Be$) for the radiator, while for photons materials with high $Z$ are used to get a high cross section for photoelectric effect (ex. $Xe$).

TRDs have been used in the ZEUS, HERA, ALICE, and ATLAS experiments at the Large Hadron Collider, as well as in experiments to detect cosmic rays. The ATLAS TRD is called TRT (Transition Radiation Tracker), which serves also as a tracker measuring particles' trajectory simultaneously. The ALICE TRD operates together with a big TPC (Time Projection Chamber) and TOF (Time of Flight) counter to do particle identification in ion collisions.
