= Ultrarelativistic limit =

Motion extremely close to the speed of light

In physics, a particle is called ultrarelativistic when its speed is very close to the speed of light c. Notations commonly used are $v \approx c$ or $\beta \approx 1$ or $\gamma \gg 1$ where $\gamma$ is the Lorentz factor, $\beta = v/c$ and $c$ is the speed of light.

The energy of an ultrarelativistic particle is almost completely due to its kinetic energy $E_k = (\gamma - 1) m c^2$. The total energy can also be approximated as $E = \gamma m c^2 \approx pc$ where $p = \gamma m v$ is the Lorentz invariant momentum.

This can result from holding the mass fixed and increasing the kinetic energy to very large values or by holding the energy E fixed and shrinking the mass m to very small values which also imply a very large $\gamma$. Particles with a very small mass do not need much energy to travel at a speed close to $c$. The latter is used to derive orbits of massless particles such as the photon from those of massive particles (cf. Kepler problem in general relativity).

== Ultrarelativistic approximations ==
Below are few ultrarelativistic approximations when $\beta \approx 1$. The rapidity is denoted $w$:

$$1 - \beta \approx \frac{1}{2\gamma^2}$$
$$w \approx \ln(2 \gamma)$$

- Motion with constant proper acceleration: d ≈ e^{aτ}/(2a), where d is the distance traveled, a = dφ/dτ is proper acceleration (with aτ ≫ 1), τ is proper time, and travel starts at rest and without changing direction of acceleration (see proper acceleration for more details).
- Fixed target collision with ultrarelativistic motion of the center of mass: E_{CM} ≈ √2E_{1}E_{2} where E_{1} and E_{2} are energies of the particle and the target respectively (so E_{1} ≫ E_{2}), and E_{CM} is energy in the center of mass frame.

== Accuracy of the approximation ==
For calculations of the energy of a particle, the relative error of the ultrarelativistic limit for a speed v = 0.95c is about 10%, and for v = 0.99c it is just 2%. For particles such as neutrinos, whose γ (Lorentz factor) are usually above 10^{6} (v practically indistinguishable from c), the approximation is essentially exact.

== Other limits ==
The opposite case (v ≪ c) is a so-called classical particle, where its speed is much smaller than c. Its kinetic energy can be approximated by first term of the $\gamma$ binomial series:

$$E_k = (\gamma - 1) m c^2 = \frac{1}{2} m v^2 + \left[\frac{3}{8} m \frac{v^4}{c^2} + ... + m c^2 \frac{(2n)!}{2^{2n}(n!)^2}\frac{v^{2n}}{c^{2n}} + ...\right]$$

== See also ==
- Relativistic particle
- Classical mechanics
- Special relativity
- Aichelburg–Sexl ultraboost
