= Relativistic similarity parameter =

In relativistic laser-plasma physics the relativistic similarity parameter S is a dimensionless parameter defined as

$$S=\frac{n_e}{a_0n_{cr}}$$,

where ${n_e}$ is the electron plasma density, ${n_{cr}=\epsilon_0 m_e \omega_0^2/e^2}$ is the critical plasma density and ${a_0=eA/(m_e c)}$ is the normalized vector potential. Here ${m_e}$ is the electron mass, ${e}$ is the electron charge, ${c}$ is the speed of light, ${\epsilon_0}$ the electric vacuum permittivity and ${\omega_0}$ is the laser frequency.

The concept of similarity and the similarity parameter ${S}$ were first introduced in plasma physics by Sergey Gordienko. It allows distinguishing between relativistically overdense ${(S\gg 1)}$ and underdense plasmas ${(S\ll 1)}$.

The similarity parameter is connected to basic symmetry properties of the collisionless Vlasov equation and is thus the relativistic plasma analog of the Reynolds number in fluid mechanics. Gordienko showed that in the relativistic limit (${a_0\gg 1}$) the laser-plasma dynamics depends on three dimensionless parameters: $\omega_0\tau$, ${R\omega_0/c}$ and ${S}$, where ${\tau}$ is the duration of the laser pulse and ${R}$ is the typical radius of the laser waist. The main result of the relativistic similarity theory can be summarized as follows: if the parameters of the interaction (plasma density and laser amplitude) change simultaneously so that the ${S}$ parameter remains constant, the dynamics of the electrons remains the same.

The similarity theory allows deriving non-trivial power-law scalings for the energy of fast electrons in underdense and overdense plasmas.
