= Rapidity =

Measure of relativistic velocity

Rapidity is the value of artanh(v / c) for velocity v and speed of light c

In special relativity, the classical concept of velocity is converted to rapidity to accommodate the limit determined by the speed of light. Velocities must be combined by Einstein's velocity-addition formula. For low speeds, rapidity and velocity are almost exactly proportional but, for higher velocities, rapidity takes a larger value, with the rapidity of light being infinite.

Mathematically, rapidity can be defined as the hyperbolic angle that differentiates two frames of reference in relative motion, each frame being associated with distance and time coordinates.

Using the inverse hyperbolic function artanh, the rapidity w corresponding to velocity v is:
$$w = \operatorname{artanh}\left(\frac{v}{c}\right)$$
where c is the speed of light. Instead of w, some authors use ζ, η, ξ, ϕ, φ, or ψ.

For low speeds, by the small-angle approximation, w is approximately v / c. Since in relativity any velocity v is constrained to the interval −c < v < c the ratio v / c satisfies −1 < v / c < 1. The inverse hyperbolic tangent has the unit interval (−1, 1) for its domain and the whole real line for its image; that is, the interval −c < v < c maps onto −∞ < w < ∞.

== History ==
Time (t) and space (x) axes: moving observers have primed or double primed axes

In 1908 Hermann Minkowski explained how the Lorentz transformation could be seen as simply a hyperbolic rotation of the spacetime coordinates, i.e., a rotation through an imaginary angle. This angle therefore represents (in one spatial dimension) a simple additive measure of the velocity between frames. The rapidity parameter replacing velocity was introduced in 1910 by Vladimir Varićak and by E. T. Whittaker. The parameter was named rapidity by Alfred Robb (1911) and this term was adopted by many subsequent authors, such as Ludwik Silberstein (1914), Frank Morley (1936) and Wolfgang Rindler (2001).

=== Minkowski diagram ===
Rapidity is the parameter expressing variability of an event on the hyperbola which represents the future events one time unit away from the origin O. These events can be expressed (sinh w, cosh w) where sinh is the hyperbolic sine and cosh is the hyperbolic cosine. Note that as speed and w increase, the axes tilt toward the diagonal. In fact, they remain in a relation of hyperbolic orthogonality whatever the value of w. The appropriate x-axis is the hyperplane of simultaneity corresponding to rapidity w at the origin.

The hyperbola can be associated with the unit hyperbola. A moving reference frame sees the spacetime in the same way the rest frame does, so a transformation theory is necessary to explain the adaptation of one to the other. When the unit hyperbola is interpreted as a one-parameter group that acts on the future, and correspondingly on the past and elsewhere, then the Minkowski configuration expresses the relativity of simultaneity and other features of relativity.

== Lorentz boost ==
The transformations relating reference frames are associated with Hendrik Lorentz. To make a moving frame with rapidity w into the rest frame with perpendicular axes of time and space, one applies a hyperbolic rotation of parameter −w. Since cosh(−w) = cosh w and sinh(−w) = −sinh w, the following matrix representation of the hyperbolic rotation will bring the moving frame into perpendicularity (though all frames keep hyperbolic orthogonality since that relation is invariant under hyperbolic rotation).

A Lorentz boost is a vector-matrix product
$$\begin{pmatrix}
c t' \\
x'
\end{pmatrix}
=
\begin{pmatrix}
\cosh w & -\sinh w \\
-\sinh w & \cosh w
\end{pmatrix}
\begin{pmatrix}
ct \\
x
\end{pmatrix}
= \mathbf \Lambda (w)
\begin{pmatrix}
ct \\
x
\end{pmatrix}.$$

The matrix Λ(w) is of the type
$$\begin{pmatrix} p & q \\ q & p \end{pmatrix}$$
with p and q satisfying p^{2} – q^{2} = 1, so that (p, q) lies on the unit hyperbola. Such matrices form the indefinite orthogonal group O(1,1) with one-dimensional Lie algebra spanned by the anti-diagonal unit matrix, showing that the rapidity is the coordinate on this Lie algebra. In matrix exponential notation, Λ(w) can be expressed as $\mathbf \Lambda (w) = e^{\mathbf Z w}$, where Z is the negative of the anti-diagonal unit matrix
$$\mathbf Z =
\begin{pmatrix}
0 & -1 \\
-1 & 0
\end{pmatrix} .$$
Since Z^{2} is the identity, Z is a hyperbolic unit.

=== Velocity addition ===
A key property of the matrix exponential is $e^{\mathbf X(s+t)}=e^{\mathbf Xs}e^{\mathbf Xt}$ from which immediately follows that
$$\mathbf{\Lambda}(w_1 + w_2) = \mathbf{\Lambda}(w_1)\mathbf{\Lambda}(w_2).$$
This establishes the useful additive property of rapidity: if A, B and C are frames of reference, then
$$w_{\text{AC}}= w_{\text{AB}} + w_{\text{BC}},$$
where w_{PQ} denotes the rapidity of a frame of reference Q relative to a frame of reference P. The simplicity of this formula contrasts with the complexity of the corresponding velocity-addition formula.

As we can see from the Lorentz transformation above, the Lorentz factor identifies with cosh w
$$\gamma = \frac{1}{\sqrt{1 - v^2 / c^2}} = \frac{1}{\sqrt{1 - \beta^2}} \equiv \cosh w,$$
so the rapidity w is implicitly used as a hyperbolic angle in the Lorentz transformation expressions using γ and β. We relate rapidities to the velocity-addition formula
$$u = \frac{u_1 + u_2}{1 + \frac{u_1 u_2}{c^2}}$$
by recognizing
$$\beta_i = \frac{u_i}{c} = \tanh{w_i}$$
and so
$$\tanh w = \frac{\tanh w_1 + \tanh w_2}{1 + \tanh w_1\tanh w_2}
= \tanh(w_1+ w_2)$$

Proper acceleration (the acceleration 'felt' by the object being accelerated) is the rate of change of rapidity with respect to proper time (time as measured by the object undergoing acceleration itself). Therefore, the rapidity of an object in a given frame can be viewed simply as the velocity of that object as would be calculated non-relativistically by an inertial guidance system on board the object itself if it accelerated from rest in that frame to its given speed.

=== Hyperbolic functions ===
The product of β and γ appears frequently in the equations of special relativity. As a result, some authors define an explicit parameter $\alpha$ for this expression, which is, from above:
$$\alpha = \beta \gamma = \tanh w \cosh w = \sinh w$$

This relationship uses hyperbolic functions of the rapidity $w$ to relate these parameters of special relativity, as Minkowski had observed:

$$\alpha = \sinh w$$
$$\beta  = \tanh w$$
$$\gamma = \cosh w$$

=== Exponential and logarithmic relations ===
From the above expressions we have
$$e^{w} = \cosh(w) + \sinh(w) = \gamma(1 + \beta) = \frac{ 1 + \beta }{ \sqrt{ 1 - \beta^2}  } = \sqrt \frac{1 + \tfrac{v}{c}}{1 - \tfrac{v}{c}},$$
and thus
$$e^{-w} = \cosh(w) - \sinh(w) = \gamma(1 - \beta) = \frac{ 1 - \beta }{ \sqrt{ 1 - \beta^2}  }   = \sqrt \frac{1 - \tfrac{v}{c}}{1 + \tfrac{v}{c}}.$$
or explicitly
$$w = \ln \left[\gamma(1 + \beta)\right] = -\ln \left[\gamma(1 - \beta)\right]  \, .$$

=== Doppler effect ===
The Doppler-shift factor, for the longitudinal case with source and receiver moving directly towards or away from each other, that is associated with rapidity w is $k = e^w$.

== In experimental particle physics ==
The energy E and scalar momentum |p| of a particle of non-zero (rest) mass m are given by:
$$\begin{align}
E &= \gamma mc^2 \\
\left| \mathbf p \right| &= \gamma mv.
\end{align}$$
With the definition of w
$$w = \operatorname{artanh} \frac{v}{c}  = \operatorname{artanh} \beta,$$
and thus with
$$\cosh w = \cosh \left( \operatorname{artanh} \frac{v}{c} \right) = \frac {1}{ \sqrt { 1- \frac{v^2}{c^2} }} = \gamma$$
$$\sinh w =  \sinh \left( \operatorname{artanh} \frac{v}{c} \right) = \frac {\frac{v}{c}}{ \sqrt { 1- \frac{v^2}{c^2} }} = \beta \gamma = \alpha ,$$
the energy and scalar momentum can be written as:
$$\begin{align}
E &= m c^2 \cosh w \\
\left| \mathbf p \right| &= m c \, \sinh w.
\end{align}$$

So, rapidity can be calculated from measured energy and momentum by
$$w = \operatorname{artanh} \frac{| \mathbf p | c}{E}= \frac{1}{2} \ln \frac{E + | \mathbf p | c}{E - | \mathbf p | c} = \ln \frac{E + | \mathbf p | c}{ mc^2}  ~.$$

However, experimental particle physicists often use a modified definition of rapidity relative to a beam axis
$$y = \frac{1}{2} \ln \frac{E + p_z c}{E - p_z c} ,$$
where p_{z} is the component of momentum along the beam axis. This is the rapidity of the boost along the beam axis which takes an observer from the lab frame to a frame in which the particle moves only perpendicular to the beam. Related to this is the concept of pseudorapidity.

Rapidity relative to a beam axis can also be expressed as
$$y = \ln \frac{E + p_z c}{\sqrt{m^2c^4+p_T^2 c^2} } ~.$$

== See also ==
- Bondi k-calculus
- Lorentz transformation
- Pseudorapidity
- Proper velocity
- Theory of relativity

== Notes and references ==
- Vladimir Varićak (1910, 1912, 1924), see Vladimir Varićak#Publications
- Whittaker, Edmund Taylor (1910). A History of the Theories of Aether and Electricity. p. 441.
- Robb, Alfred (1911). Optical geometry of motion, a new view of the theory of relativity. Cambridge: Heffner & Sons.
- Émile Borel (1913), La théorie de la relativité et la cinématique (in French), Comptes rendus de l'Académie des Sciences, Paris: volume 156, pages 215–218; volume 157, pages 703–705
- Silberstein, Ludwik (1914). The Theory of Relativity. London: Macmillan & Co. p. 179.
- Vladimir Karapetoff (1936), "Restricted relativity in terms of hyperbolic functions of rapidities", American Mathematical Monthly, volume 43, page 70.
- Frank Morley (1936), "When and Where", The Criterion, edited by Thomas Stearns Eliot, volume 15, pages 200–209.
- Wolfgang Rindler (2001) Relativity: Special, General, and Cosmological, page 53, Oxford University Press.
- Shaw, Ronald (1982) Linear Algebra and Group Representations, volume 1, page 229, Academic Press ISBN 0-12-639201-3.
- Walter, Scott (1999). "The non-Euclidean style of Minkowskian relativity" (PDF). In Jeremy John Gray (ed.). The Symbolic Universe: Geometry and Physics. Oxford University Press. pp. 91–127. Archived from the original (PDF) on 2013-10-16.(see page 17 of e-link)
- Rhodes, John A.; Semon, Mark D. (2004). "Relativistic velocity space, Wigner rotation, and Thomas precession". American Journal of Physics. 72 (7): 90–93. arXiv:gr-qc/0501070. Bibcode:2004AmJPh..72..943R. doi:10.1119/1.1652040. S2CID 14764378.
- Jackson, John David (1999) [1962]. "Chapter 11". Classical Electrodynamics (3rd ed.). John Wiley & Sons. ISBN 0-471-30932-X.
