= Proper velocity =

Ratio in relativity

Log-log plot of γ (blue), v/c (cyan), and η (yellow) versus proper velocity w/c (i.e. momentum p/mc). Note that w/c is tracked by v/c at low speeds and by γ at high speeds. The dashed red curve is γ − 1 (kinetic energy K/mc^{2}), while the dashed magenta curve is the relativistic Doppler factor.

In relativity, proper velocity (also known as celerity) w of an object relative to an observer is the ratio between observer-measured displacement vector $\textbf{x}$ and proper time τ elapsed on the clocks of the traveling object:

$$\textbf{w} = \frac{d\textbf{x}}{d\tau}$$

It is an alternative to ordinary velocity, the distance per unit time where both distance and time are measured by the observer.

The two types of velocity, ordinary and proper, are very nearly equal at low speeds. However, at high speeds proper velocity retains many of the properties that velocity loses in relativity compared with Newtonian theory. For example, proper velocity equals momentum per unit mass at any speed, and therefore has no upper limit. At high speeds, as shown in the figure at right, it is proportional to an object's energy as well.

Proper velocity w can be related to the ordinary velocity v via the Lorentz factor γ:

$$\textbf{w} = \frac{d\textbf{x}}{dt}\frac{dt}{d\tau}=\textbf{v} \,\gamma(v)$$

where t is coordinate time or "map time". For unidirectional motion, each of these is also simply related to a traveling object's hyperbolic velocity angle or rapidity η by

$$\eta = \sinh^{-1}\frac{w}{c} = \tanh^{-1}\frac{v}{c} = \pm \cosh^{-1}\gamma$$.

== Introduction ==
In flat spacetime, proper velocity is the ratio between distance traveled relative to a reference map frame (used to define simultaneity) and proper time τ elapsed on the clocks of the traveling object. It equals the object's momentum p divided by its rest mass m, and is made up of the space-like components of the object's four-vector velocity. William Shurcliff's monograph mentioned its early use in the Sears and Brehme text. Fraundorf has explored its pedagogical value while Ungar, Baylis and Hestenes have examined its relevance from group theory and geometric algebra perspectives. Proper velocity is sometimes referred to as celerity.

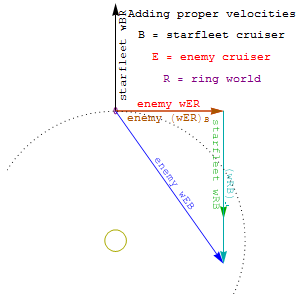
A cruiser drops out of hyperspace...

Unlike the more familiar coordinate velocity v, proper velocity is synchrony-free (does not require synchronized clocks) and is useful for describing both super-relativistic and sub-relativistic motion. Like coordinate velocity and unlike four-vector velocity, it resides in the three-dimensional slice of spacetime defined by the map frame. As shown below and in the example figure at right, proper-velocities even add as three vectors with rescaling of the out-of-frame component. This makes them more useful for map-based (e.g. engineering) applications, and less useful for gaining coordinate-free insight. Proper speed divided by lightspeed c is the hyperbolic sine of rapidity η, just as the Lorentz factor γ is rapidity's hyperbolic cosine, and coordinate speed v over lightspeed is rapidity's hyperbolic tangent.

Imagine an object traveling through a region of spacetime locally described by Hermann Minkowski's flat-space metric equation (cdτ)^{2} = (cdt)^{2} − (dx)^{2}. Here a reference map frame of yardsticks and synchronized clocks define map position x and map time t respectively, and the d preceding a coordinate means infinitesimal change. A bit of manipulation allows one to show that proper velocity w = dx/dτ = γv where as usual coordinate velocity v = dx/dt. Thus finite w ensures that v is less than lightspeed c. By grouping γ with v in the expression for relativistic momentum p, proper velocity also extends the Newtonian form of momentum as mass times velocity to high speeds without a need for relativistic mass.

== Proper velocity addition formula ==
The proper velocity addition formula:

$$\mathbf{u} \oplus \mathbf{v}=\mathbf{u}+\mathbf{v}+\left\{ {\frac{\beta_\mathbf{u}}{1+\beta_\mathbf{u}}}{\frac{\mathbf{u}\cdot\mathbf{v}}{c^2}} + {\frac{1 - \beta_\mathbf{v}}{\beta_\mathbf{v}}} \right\} \mathbf{u}$$

where $\beta_\mathbf{w}$ is the beta factor given by $\beta_\mathbf{w}=\frac{1}{\sqrt{1+\frac{|\mathbf{w}|^2}{c^2}}}$.

This formula provides a proper velocity gyrovector space model of hyperbolic geometry that uses a whole space compared to other models of hyperbolic geometry which use discs or half-planes.

In the unidirectional case this becomes commutative and simplifies to a Lorentz factor product times a coordinate velocity sum, e.g. to w_{AC} = γ_{AB}γ_{BC}(v_{AB} + v_{BC}), as discussed in the application section below.

== Relation to other velocity parameters ==
=== Speed table ===
The table below illustrates how the proper velocity of w = c or "one map-lightyear per traveler-year" is a natural benchmark for the transition from sub-relativistic to super-relativistic motion.

Comparison of benchmark values, several near the relativistic slope-change in KE vs. momentum.
Condition/Parameter	Coordinate velocity v dx/dt in units of c	Velocity angle η in i-radians	Proper velocity w dx/dτ in units of c	Lorentz factor γ dt/dτ = E/mc^{2}
Traveler stopped in map-frame ⇔ 1 map-year/traveler-year	0	0	0	1
Momentum = 1/2mc ⇔ 0.5 map-lightyear/traveler-year	1/√5 ≅ 0.447	ln[(1 + √5)/2] ≅ 0.481	1/2	√5/2 ≅ 1.118
Rapidity of 0.5 hyperbolic radian	(e − 1)/(e + 1) ≅ 0.462	1/2	1/2(√e − 1/√e) ≅ 0.521	1/2(√e + 1/√e) ≅ 1.128
Coordinate velocity = 1/2c ⇔ 0.5 map-lightyear/map-year	1/2	1/2ln[3] ≅ 0.549	1/√3 ≅ 0.577	2/√3 ≅ 1.155
Momentum = mc ⇔ 1 map-lightyear/traveler-year	1/√2 ≅ 0.707	ln[1 + √2] ≅ 0.881	1	√2 ≅ 1.414
Rapidity of 1 hyperbolic radian	(e^{2} − 1)/(e^{2} + 1) ≅ 0.761	1	1/2(e − 1/e) ≅ 1.175	1/2(e + 1/e) ≅ 1.543
Kinetic energy = mc^{2} ⇔ 2 map-years/traveler-year	√3/2 ≅ 0.866	ln[√3 + 2] ≅ 1.317	√3 ≅ 1.732	2
Momentum = 2mc ⇔ 2 map-lightyears/traveler-year	2/√5 ≅ 0.894	ln[2 + √5] ≅ 1.444	2	√5 ≅ 2.236
Rapidity of 2 hyperbolic radians	(e^{4}−1)/(e^{4}+1) ≅ 0.964	2	1/2(e^{2} − 1/e^{2}) ≅ 3.627	1/2(e^{2} + 1/e^{2}) ≅ 3.762
Coordinate velocity = c ⇔ 1 map-lightyear/map-year	1	∞	∞	∞

Note from above that velocity angle η and proper-velocity w run from 0 to infinity and track coordinate-velocity when w << c. On the other hand, when w >> c, proper velocity tracks Lorentz factor while velocity angle is logarithmic and hence increases much more slowly.

=== Interconversion equations ===
The following equations convert between four alternate measures of speed (or unidirectional velocity) that flow from Minkowski's flat-space metric equation:

$$(c \delta \tau)^2 = (c \delta t)^2 - (\delta x)^2.\,$$.

==== Lorentz factor γ: energy over mc^{2} ≥ 1 ====
$$\gamma \equiv \frac{dt}{d\tau}= \sqrt{1+\left(\frac{w}{c}\right)^2} = \frac{1}{\sqrt{1-(\frac{v}{c})^2}} = \cosh(\eta) \equiv \frac{e^{\eta} + e^{-\eta}}{2}$$

==== Proper velocity w: momentum per unit mass ====
$$\frac{w}{c} \equiv \frac{1}{c} \frac{dx}{d\tau}  = \frac{v}{c} \frac{1}{\sqrt{1-(\frac{v}{c})^2}} = \sinh(\eta)\equiv \frac{e^{\eta} - e^{-\eta}}{2} = \pm \sqrt{\gamma^2 - 1}$$

==== Coordinate velocity: v ≤ c ====
$$\frac{v}{c} \equiv \frac{1}{c} \frac{dx}{dt}  = \frac{w}{c} \frac{1}{\sqrt{1 + (\frac{w}{c})^2}} = \tanh(\eta) \equiv \frac{e^{2\eta} - 1} {e^{2\eta} + 1}= \pm \sqrt{1 - \left(\frac{1}{\gamma}\right)^2}$$

==== Hyperbolic velocity angle or rapidity ====
$$\eta = \sinh^{-1}\left(\frac{w}{c}\right) = \tanh^{-1}\left(\frac{v}{c}\right) = \pm \cosh^{-1} \left(\gamma \right)$$

or in terms of logarithms:

$$\eta = \ln\left(\frac{w}{c} + \sqrt{\left(\frac{w}{c}\right)^2 + 1}\right) = \frac{1}{2} \ln\left(\frac{1+\frac{v}{c}}{1-\frac{v}{c}}\right) = \pm \ln\left(\gamma + \sqrt{\gamma^2 - 1}\right)$$.

== Applications ==
=== Comparing velocities at high speed ===
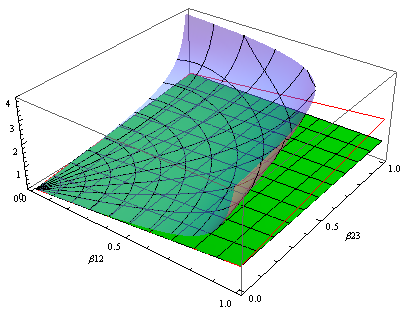
Unidirectional velocity addition: The proper sum curves up.

Proper velocity is useful for comparing the speed of objects with momentum per unit rest mass (w) greater than lightspeed c. The coordinate speed of such objects is generally near lightspeed, whereas proper velocity indicates how rapidly they are covering ground on traveling-object clocks. This is important for example if, like some cosmic ray particles, the traveling objects have a finite lifetime. Proper velocity also clues us in to the object's momentum, which has no upper bound.

For example, a 45 GeV electron accelerated by the Large Electron–Positron Collider (LEP) at CERN in 1989 had a Lorentz factor γ of about 88,000 (45 GeV divided by the electron rest mass of 511 keV). Its coordinate speed v was about sixty-four trillionths shy of lightspeed c at 1 light-second per map second. On the other hand, its proper speed was w = γv ~ 88,000 light-seconds per traveler second. By comparison the coordinate speed of a 250 GeV electron in the proposed International Linear Collider (ILC) will be only minutely closer to c, while its proper speed will significantly increase to ~489,000 lightseconds per traveler second.

Proper velocity is also useful for comparing relative velocities along a line at high speed. In this case

$$\frac{p_{AC}}{m_1}=w_{AC}= \gamma_{AC} v_{AC} =\gamma_{AB} \gamma_{BC} \left( v_{AB}+v_{BC} \right) = \gamma_{AB} w_{BC}+w_{AB} \gamma_{BC}\,$$

where A, B and C refer to different objects or frames of reference. For example, w_{AC} refers to the proper speed of object A with respect to object C. Thus in calculating the relative proper speed, Lorentz factors multiply when coordinate speeds add.

Hence each of two electrons (A and C) in a head-on collision at 45 GeV in the lab frame (B) would see the other coming toward them at v_{AC} ~ c and w_{AC} = 88,000^{2}(1 + 1) ~ 1.55×10^{10} lightseconds per traveler second. Thus from the target's point of view, colliders can explore collisions with much higher projectile energy and momentum per unit mass.

=== Proper velocity-based dispersion relations ===
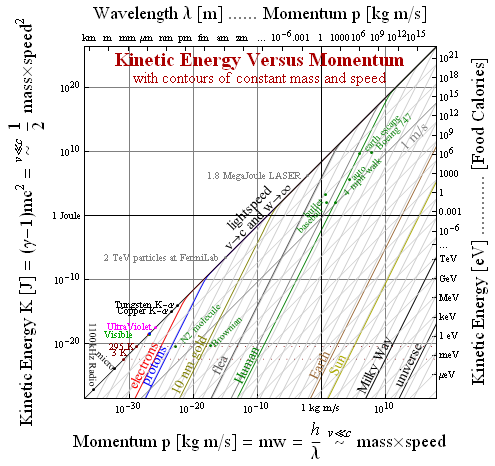
Plots of (γ − 1)c^{2} × mass, versus proper velocity × mass, for a range of mass values along both axes.

Plotting "(γ − 1) versus proper velocity" after multiplying the former by mc^{2} and the latter by mass m, for various values of m yields a family of kinetic energy versus momentum curves that includes most of the moving objects encountered in everyday life. Such plots can for example be used to show where the speed of light, the Planck constant, and Boltzmann energy kT figure in.

To illustrate, the figure at right with log-log axes shows objects with the same kinetic energy (horizontally related) that carry different amounts of momentum, as well as how the speed of a low-mass object compares (by vertical extrapolation) to the speed after perfectly inelastic collision with a large object at rest. Highly sloped lines (rise/run = 2) mark contours of constant mass, while lines of unit slope mark contours of constant speed.

Objects that fit nicely on this plot are humans driving cars, dust particles in Brownian motion, a spaceship in orbit around the Sun, molecules at room temperature, a fighter jet at Mach 3, one radio wave photon, a person moving at one lightyear per traveler year, the pulse of a 1.8 MegaJoule laser, a 250 GeV electron, and our observable universe with the blackbody kinetic energy expected of a single particle at 3 kelvin.

=== Unidirectional acceleration via proper velocity ===
Proper acceleration at any speed is the physical acceleration experienced locally by an object. In spacetime it is a three-vector acceleration with respect to the object's instantaneously varying free-float frame. Its magnitude α is the frame-invariant magnitude of that object's four-acceleration. Proper acceleration is also useful from the vantage point (or spacetime slice) of external observers. Not only may observers in all frames agree on its magnitude, but it also measures the extent to which an accelerating rocket "has its pedal to the metal".

In the unidirectional case i.e. when the object's acceleration is parallel or anti-parallel to its velocity in the spacetime slice of the observer, the change in proper velocity is the integral of proper acceleration over map time i.e. Δw = αΔt for constant α. At low speeds this reduces to the well-known relation between coordinate velocity and coordinate acceleration times map time, i.e. Δv = aΔt. For constant unidirectional proper acceleration, similar relationships exist between rapidity η and elapsed proper time Δτ, as well as between Lorentz factor γ and distance traveled Δx. To be specific:

$$\alpha=\frac{\Delta w}{\Delta t}=c \frac{\Delta \eta}{\Delta \tau}=c^2 \frac{\Delta \gamma}{\Delta x}$$,

where as noted above the various velocity parameters are related by

$$\eta = \sinh^{-1}\left(\frac{w}{c}\right) = \tanh^{-1}\left(\frac{v}{c}\right) = \pm \cosh^{-1}\left(\gamma\right)$$.

These equations describe some consequences of accelerated travel at high speed. For example, imagine a spaceship that can accelerate its passengers at 1 g (or 1.03 lightyears/year^{2}) halfway to their destination, and then decelerate them at 1 g for the remaining half so as to provide Earth-like artificial gravity from point A to point B over the shortest possible time. For a map distance of Δx_{AB}, the first equation above predicts a midpoint Lorentz factor (up from its unit rest value) of γ_{mid} = 1 + α(Δx_{AB}/2)/c^{2}. Hence the round-trip time on traveler clocks will be Δτ = 4(c/α)cosh^{−1}[γ_{mid}], during which the time elapsed on map clocks will be Δt = 4(c/α)sinh[cosh^{−1}[γ_{mid}]].

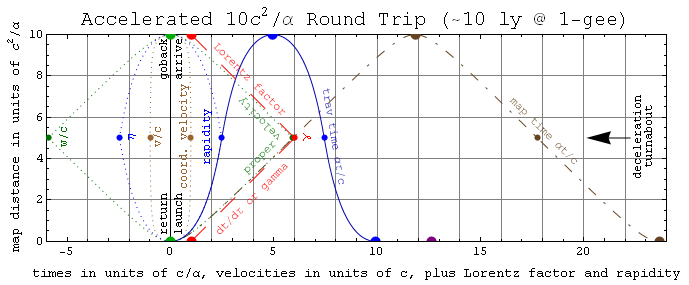
Plot of velocity parameters and times on the horizontal axis, versus position on the vertical axis, for an accelerated twin roundtrip to a destination with Δx_{AB} = 10c^{2}/α ~10 light-years away if α ≈ 9.8 m/s^{2}.

This imagined spaceship could offer round trips to Proxima Centauri lasting about 7.1 traveler years (~12 years on Earth clocks), round trips to the Milky Way's central black hole of about 40 years (~54,000 years elapsed on Earth clocks), and round trips to Andromeda Galaxy lasting around 57 years (over 5 million years on Earth clocks). Unfortunately, while rocket accelerations of 1 g can easily be achieved, they cannot be sustained over long periods of time.

== See also ==
- Kinematics: for studying ways that position changes with time
- Lorentz factor: γ = dt/dτ or kinetic energy over mc^{2}
- Rapidity: hyperbolic velocity angle in imaginary radians
- Four-velocity: combining travel through time and space
- Uniform acceleration: holding coordinate acceleration fixed
- Gullstrand–Painlevé coordinates: free-float frames in curved spacetime.
