= Relativistic plasma =

Relativistic plasmas in physics are plasmas for which relativistic corrections to a particle's mass and velocity are important. Such corrections typically become important when a significant number of electrons reach speeds greater than 0.86c (Lorentz factor γ = 2).

Such plasmas may be created either by heating a gas to very high temperatures or by the impact of a high-energy particle beam. A relativistic plasma with a thermal distribution function has temperatures greater than around 260 keV, or 3.0 GK (5.5 billion degrees Fahrenheit), where approximately 10% of the electrons have γ > 2. Since these temperatures are so high, most relativistic plasmas are small and brief, and are often the result of a relativistic beam impacting some target. (More mundanely, "relativistic plasma" might denote a normal, cold plasma moving at a significant fraction of the speed of light relative to the observer.)

Relativistic plasmas may result when two particle beams collide at speeds comparable to the speed of light, and in the cores of supernovae. Plasmas hot enough for particles other than electrons to be relativistic are even more rare, since other particles are more massive and thus require more energy to accelerate to a significant fraction of the speed of light. (About 10% of protons would have γ > 2 at a temperature of 481 MeV, equivalent to 5.6 TK.) Still higher energies are necessary to achieve a quark–gluon plasma.

The primary changes in a plasma's behavior as it approaches the relativistic regime is slight modifications to the equations which describe a non-relativistic plasma and to collision and interaction cross sections. The equations may also need modifications to account for pair production of electron-positron pairs (or other particles at the highest temperatures).

A plasma double layer with a large potential drop and layer separation, may accelerate electrons to relativistic velocities, and produce synchrotron radiation.

== Applications ==
- Laser Wakefield Acceleration
