= Lorentz factor =

Quantity in relativistic physics

Definition of the Lorentz factor γ

The Lorentz factor or Lorentz term (also known as the gamma factor) is a dimensionless quantity expressing how much the measurements of time, length, and other physical properties change for an object while it moves. The expression appears in several equations in special relativity, and it arises in derivations of the Lorentz transformations. The name originates from its earlier appearance in Lorentzian electrodynamics – named after the Dutch physicist Hendrik Lorentz.

It is generally denoted γ (the Greek lowercase letter gamma). Sometimes (especially in discussion of superluminal motion) the factor is written as Γ (Greek uppercase-gamma) rather than γ.

== Definition ==
The Lorentz factor γ is defined as
$$\gamma = \frac{1}{\sqrt{1 - \frac{v^2}{c^2}}} = \frac{1}{\sqrt{1 - \beta^2}} = \frac{dt}{d\tau} ,$$
where:

- v is the relative velocity between inertial reference frames,
- c is the speed of light in vacuum,
- β is the ratio of v to c,
- t is coordinate time,
- τ is the proper time for an observer (measuring time intervals in the observer's own frame).

This is the most frequently used form in practice, though not the only one (see below for alternative forms). To complement the definition, some authors define the reciprocal
$$\alpha = \frac{1}{\gamma} = \sqrt{1- \frac{v^2}{c^2}} \ = \sqrt{1- {\beta}^2} ;$$
see velocity addition formula.

== Occurrence ==
Following is a list of formulae from Special relativity which use γ as a shorthand:

- The Lorentz transformation: The simplest case is a boost in the x-direction (more general forms including arbitrary directions and rotations not listed here), which describes how spacetime coordinates change from one inertial frame using coordinates (x, y, z, t) to another (x′, y′, z′, t′) with relative velocity v:
  $$\begin{align}
t' &= \gamma \left( t - \tfrac{vx}{c^2} \right ), \\[1ex]
x' &= \gamma \left( x - vt \right ).
\end{align}$$

Corollaries of the above transformations are the results:

- Time dilation: The time (∆t′) between two ticks as measured in the frame in which the clock is moving, is longer than the time (∆t) between these ticks as measured in the rest frame of the clock:
  $$\Delta t' = \gamma \Delta t.$$
- Length contraction: The length (∆x′) of an object as measured in the frame in which it is moving, is shorter than its length (∆x) in its own rest frame:
  $$\Delta x' = \Delta x/\gamma.$$

Applying conservation of momentum and energy leads to these results:

- Relativistic mass: The relativistic mass m of an object in motion is dependent on $\gamma$ and the rest mass m_{0}:
  $$m = \gamma m_0.$$
- Relativistic momentum: The relativistic momentum relation takes the same form as for classical momentum, but using the above relativistic mass:
  $$\vec p = m \vec v = \gamma m_0 \vec v.$$
- Relativistic kinetic energy: The relativistic kinetic energy relation takes the slightly modified form:
  $$E_k = E - E_0 = (\gamma - 1) m_0 c^2$$
  As $\gamma$ is a function of $\tfrac{v}{c}$, the non-relativistic limit gives $\lim_{v/c\to 0}E_k=\tfrac{1}{2}m_0v^2$, as expected from Newtonian considerations.

== Numerical values ==
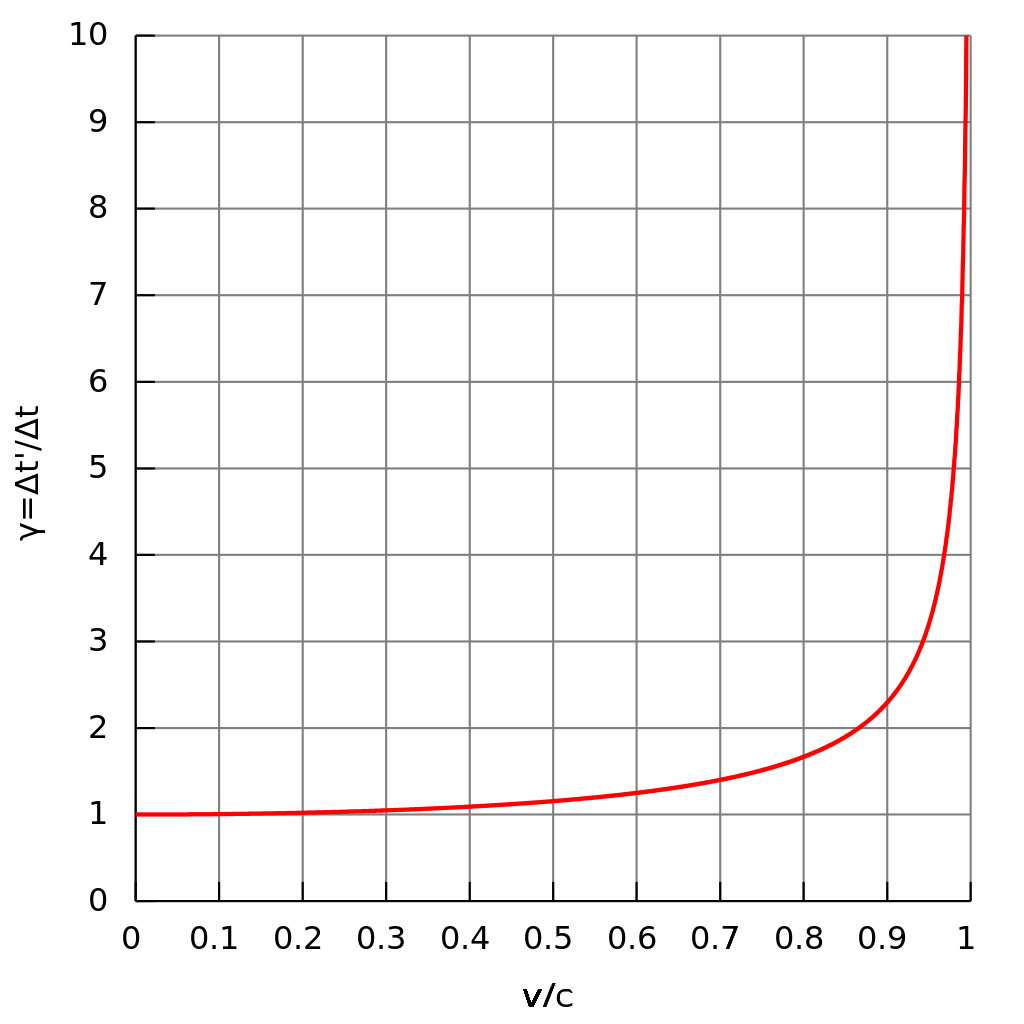
Lorentz factor γ as a function of velocity, expressed as a fraction of the speed of light (v/c). Its initial value is 1 (when v = 0); and as velocity approaches the speed of light (v → c) γ increases without bound (γ → ∞).

α (Lorentz factor inverse) as a function of velocity—a circular arc

In the table below, the left-hand column shows speeds as different fractions of the speed of light (i.e. in units of c). The middle column shows the corresponding Lorentz factor, the final is the reciprocal. Values in bold are exact.

Speed (units of c), β = v/c	Lorentz factor, γ	Reciprocal, 1/γ
**0**	**1**	**1**
**0.050**	1.001	0.999
**0.100**	1.005	0.995
**0.150**	1.011	0.989
**0.200**	1.021	0.980
**0.250**	1.033	0.968
**0.300**	1.048	0.954
**0.400**	1.091	0.917
**0.500**	1.155	0.866
**0.600**	**1.25**	**0.8**
**0.700**	1.400	0.714
**0.750**	1.512	0.661
**0.800**	1.667	**0.6**
0.866	**2**	**0.5**
**0.900**	2.294	0.436
0.980	**5**	**0.2**
**0.990**	7.089	0.141
0.995	**10**	**0.1**
**0.999**	22.366	0.045
**0.99995**	100.00	0.010

Log-log plot of Lorentz factor γ (left) and 1/γ (right) vs fraction of speed of light β (bottom) and 1−β (top)

== Alternative representations ==
There are other ways to write the factor. Above, velocity v was used, but related variables such as momentum and rapidity may also be convenient.

=== Momentum ===
Solving the previous relativistic momentum equation for γ leads to
$$\gamma = \sqrt{1+\left ( \frac{p}{m_0 c} \right )^2 } \,.$$
This form is rarely used, although it does appear in the Maxwell–Jüttner distribution.

=== Rapidity ===
Applying the definition of rapidity as the hyperbolic angle $\varphi$:
$$\tanh \varphi = \beta$$
also leads to γ (by use of hyperbolic identities):
$$\gamma = \cosh \varphi = \frac{1}{\sqrt{1 - \tanh^2 \varphi}} = \frac{1}{\sqrt{1 - \beta^2}}.$$

Using the property of Lorentz transformation, it can be shown that rapidity is additive, a useful property that velocity does not have. Thus the rapidity parameter forms a one-parameter group, a foundation for physical models.

=== Bessel function ===
The Bunney identity represents the Lorentz factor in terms of an infinite series of Bessel functions:
$$\sum_{m=1}^\infty \left(J^2_{m-1}(m\beta)+J^2_{m+1}(m\beta)\right)=\frac{1}{\sqrt{1-\beta^2}}.$$

=== Series expansion (velocity) ===
The Lorentz factor has the following Maclaurin series:
$$\begin{align}
\gamma & = \dfrac{1}{\sqrt{1 - \beta^2}} \\[1ex]
& = \sum_{n=0}^{\infty} \beta^{2n}\prod_{k=1}^n \left(\dfrac{2k - 1}{2k}\right) \\[1ex]
& = 1 + \tfrac12 \beta^2 + \tfrac38 \beta^4 + \tfrac{5}{16} \beta^6 + \tfrac{35}{128} \beta^8 + \tfrac{63}{256} \beta^{10} + \cdots ,
\end{align}$$
which is a special case of a binomial series.

The approximation $\gamma \approx 1 + \frac{1}{2}\beta^2$ may be used to calculate relativistic effects at low speeds. It holds to within 1% error for v < 0.4 c (v < 120,000 km/s), and to within 0.1% error for v < 0.22 c (v < 66,000 km/s).

The truncated versions of this series also allow physicists to prove that special relativity reduces to Newtonian mechanics at low speeds. For example, in special relativity, the following two equations hold:

$$\begin{align}
\mathbf p & = \gamma m \mathbf v, \\
E & = \gamma m c^2.
\end{align}$$

For $\gamma \approx 1$ and $\gamma \approx 1 + \frac{1}{2}\beta^2$, respectively, these reduce to their Newtonian equivalents:

$$\begin{align}
\mathbf p & = m \mathbf v, \\
E & = m c^2 + \tfrac12 m v^2.
\end{align}$$

The Lorentz factor equation can also be inverted to yield
$$\beta = \sqrt{1 - \frac{1}{\gamma^2}} .$$
This has an asymptotic form
$$\beta = 1 - \tfrac12 \gamma^{-2} - \tfrac18 \gamma^{-4} - \tfrac{1}{16} \gamma^{-6} - \tfrac{5}{128} \gamma^{-8} + \cdots\,.$$

The first two terms are occasionally used to quickly calculate velocities from large γ values. The approximation $\beta \approx 1 - \frac{1}{2}\gamma^{-2}$ holds to within 1% tolerance for γ > 2, and to within 0.1% tolerance for γ > 3.5.

== Applications in astronomy ==
The standard model of long-duration gamma-ray bursts (GRBs) holds that these explosions are ultra-relativistic (initial γ greater than approximately 100), which is invoked to explain the so-called "compactness" problem: absent this ultra-relativistic expansion, the ejecta would be optically thick to pair production at typical peak spectral energies of a few 100 keV, whereas the prompt emission is observed to be non-thermal.

Muons, a subatomic particle, travel at a speed such that they have a relatively high Lorentz factor and therefore experience extreme time dilation. Since muons have a mean lifetime of just 2.2 μs, muons generated from cosmic-ray collisions 10 km (6.2 mi) high in Earth's atmosphere should be nondetectable on the ground due to their decay rate. However, roughly 10% of muons from these collisions are still detectable on the surface, thereby demonstrating the effects of time dilation on their decay rate.

== See also ==
- Inertial frame of reference
- Proper velocity
- Pseudorapidity
