= Algebra of physical space =

Algebra of 4D spacetime

In physics, the name "algebra of physical space" (APS) originally stems from the use of the biquaternions via its definition as the real Clifford or geometric algebra Cl_{3,0}(R), also written $\mathbb{G}_3$ or $\mathbb{R}_3$, of three-dimensional Euclidean space as a model for (3+1)-dimensional spacetime, representing a point in spacetime via a paravector (3-dimensional vector plus a 1-dimensional scalar). Although, recent research has adopted the name "APS" as a synonym for Cl_{3,0}(R) in general contexts.

The Clifford algebra Cl_{3,0}(R) has a faithful representation, generated by Pauli matrices, on the spin representation C^{2}; further, Cl_{3,0}(R) is isomorphic to the even subalgebra Cl^{[0]}_{3,1}(R) (also $\mathbb{G}_{3,1}^+$) of the Clifford algebra Cl_{3,1}(R) (also $\mathbb{G}_{3,1}$), and to the even subalgebra Cl^{[0]}_{1,3}(R) (also $\mathbb{G}_{1,3}^+$) of the spacetime algebra Cl_{1,3}(R) (also $\mathbb{G}_{1,3}$).

The APS can be used to construct a compact, unified, and geometrical formalism for both classical and quantum mechanics. This blurs the line between what is traditionally considered classical or quantum.

The APS should not be confused with spacetime algebra (STA), which concerns the Clifford algebra Cl_{1,3}(R) of the four-dimensional Minkowski spacetime.

== Involution notation ==
All Clifford or geometric algebras have three main involutions: grade involution, reversion, and Clifford conjugation.

If $g\in\mathbb{G}_3$ is an arbitrary multivector and $\langle g\rangle_j$ projects $g$ onto its grade-j subspace $\mathbb{G}_3^j$ of j-vectors, then the grade involution in the APS is defined as
$$g^-=\langle g\rangle_0-\langle g\rangle_1+\langle g\rangle_2-\langle g\rangle_3.$$
In the APS, grade involution may be called parity conjugation as it is generated by the STA's definition of parity conjugation $g^-=\gamma_0 g\gamma_0$ in tandem with the isomorphism $\mathbb{G}_3\approx\mathbb{G}_{1,3}^+$. The notation for grade involution in the APS is not a settled matter, and is also denoted by $\hat{g}$ or $\overline{g}^\dagger$.

For an additional multivector $h\in\mathbb{G}_3$, the reversion (also reverse conjugate) in the APS is defined by
$$(gh)^\dagger=h^\dagger g^\dagger$$
and
$$g^\dagger = \langle g\rangle_0+\langle g\rangle_1-\langle g\rangle_2-\langle g\rangle_3.$$
In the APS, reversion may be called Hermitian conjugation as it is completely equivalent through the Pauli matrix representation of the APS, and is generated by the STA's definition of Hermitian conjugation $g^\dagger = \gamma_0\widetilde{g}\gamma_0$ in tandem with the isomorphism $\mathbb{G}_3\approx\mathbb{G}_{1,3}^+$.

The final involution, Clifford conjugation, is defined by
$$\widetilde{gh}=\widetilde{h}\widetilde{g}$$
and
$$\widetilde{g}=(g^-)^\dagger=(g^\dagger)^-=\langle g\rangle_0-\langle g\rangle_1-\langle g\rangle_2+\langle g\rangle_3.$$
In the APS, reversion may be called spacetime reversion as via the isomorphism $\mathbb{G}_3\approx\mathbb{G}_{1,3}^+$, reversion within the STA is identical to Clifford conjugation within the APS. The above tilde notation is more recent and was adopted to emphasize this relationship.

== Special relativity ==
=== Spacetime position paravector ===
In the APS, the spacetime position is represented as the paravector
$$x = x^\mu\mathbf{e}_\mu = x^0 + x^1 \mathbf{e}_1 + x^2 \mathbf{e}_2 + x^3 \mathbf{e}_3,$$
where the time is given by the scalar part x^{0} = ct, e_{0}=1, and {e_{1}, e_{2}, e_{3}} is the standard orthonormal basis for position space. Throughout the remainder of this article and unless stated otherwise, units such that c = 1 are used, called natural units. In the Pauli matrix representation, the unit basis vectors are replaced by the Pauli matrices and the scalar part by the identity matrix. This means that the Pauli matrix representation of the space-time position is
$$x \rightarrow  \begin{pmatrix} x^0 + x^3 && x^1 - ix^2 \\ x^1 + ix^2 && x^0-x^3\end{pmatrix}$$

=== Lorentz transformations and rotors ===
The restricted Lorentz transformations that preserve the direction of time and include rotations and boosts can be performed by an exponentiation of the spacetime rotation biparavector W
$$L = e^{W/2} .$$

In the matrix representation, the Lorentz rotor is seen to form an instance of the SL(2, C) group (special linear group of degree 2 over the complex numbers), which is the double cover of the Lorentz group. The unimodularity of the Lorentz rotor is translated in the following condition in terms of the product of the Lorentz rotor with its Clifford conjugation
$$\Lambda\widetilde{\Lambda} = \widetilde{\Lambda} \Lambda = 1 .$$

This Lorentz rotor can be always decomposed in two factors, one Hermitian L = L^{†} (a Lorentz boost), and the other unitary R^{†} = R^{−1} (a 3-dimensional rotation), such that
$$\Lambda = L R .$$

The unitary element R is called a rotor because this encodes rotations, and the Hermitian element L encodes boosts. The total object $\Lambda$ is called a Lorentz rotor.

=== Four-velocity paravector ===
The four-velocity (also proper velocity or spacetime velocity) is defined as the derivative of the spacetime position paravector with respect to proper time τ:
$$u = \frac{d x }{d \tau} = \frac{d x^0}{d\tau} +
\frac{d}{d\tau}(x^1 \mathbf{e}_1 + x^2 \mathbf{e}_2 + x^3 \mathbf{e}_3) =
\frac{d x^0}{d\tau}\left[1 +  \frac{d}{d x^0}(x^1 \mathbf{e}_1 + x^2 \mathbf{e}_2 + x^3 \mathbf{e}_3)\right].$$

This expression can be brought to a more compact form by defining the ordinary velocity as
$$\mathbf{v} = \frac{d}{d x^0}(x^1 \mathbf{e}_1 + x^2 \mathbf{e}_2 + x^3 \mathbf{e}_3) ,$$
and recalling the definition of the gamma factor:
$$\gamma(\mathbf{v}) = \frac{1}{\sqrt{1-\frac{|\mathbf{v}|^2}{c^2}}} ,$$
so that the proper velocity is more compactly:
$$u = \gamma(\mathbf{v})(1 + \mathbf{v}).$$

The proper velocity is a positive unimodular paravector, which implies the following condition in terms of the Clifford conjugation
$$u \widetilde{u} = 1 .$$

The proper velocity transforms under the action of the Lorentz rotor $\Lambda$ as
$$u \rightarrow u^\prime = \Lambda u \Lambda^\dagger.$$
This transformation law can be easily derived from the isomorphism between the APS and the even subalgebra of the STA.

=== Four-momentum paravector ===
The four-momentum (also spacetime momentum) in the APS can be obtained by multiplying the proper velocity with the mass as
$$p = m u,$$
with the mass shell condition translated into
$$\widetilde{p}p = p\widetilde{p} = pp^-= p^-p= m^2 .$$

The proper velocity u may be represented as the Lorentz transformation of the rest velocity 1:
$$u = \Lambda\Lambda^\dagger.$$
This implies that the spacetime momentum can likewise be written as the Lorentz transformation of the rest momentum m,
$$p = \Lambda m\Lambda^\dagger.$$
This trivial rewrite also connects the APS to other areas of Physics; namely helicity-spinor methods for scattering amplitudes and for the Constructive Standard Model (CSM).

== Classical electrodynamics ==
=== Electromagnetic field, potential, and current ===
The electromagnetic field is represented as a bi-paravector F:
$$F = \mathbf{E}+ i \mathbf{B} ,$$
where the Hermitian part gives the electric field E, the anti-Hermitian part gives the magnetic field B, and $i=\mathbf{e}_1\mathbf{e}_2\mathbf{e}_3$ is the unit pseudoscalar. In the standard Pauli matrix representation, the electromagnetic field is:
$$F \rightarrow
\begin{pmatrix}  E_3 & E_1 -i E_2 \\ E_1 +i E_2 & -E_3  \end{pmatrix}
+ i \begin{pmatrix}  B_3 & B_1 -i B_2 \\ B_1 +i B_2 & -B_3 \end{pmatrix}\,.$$

The source of the field F is the electromagnetic four-current:
$$J = \rho + \mathbf{J}\,,$$
where the scalar part equals the electric charge density ρ, and the vector part the electric current density J. Introducing the electromagnetic potential paravector defined as:
$$A=\phi+\mathbf{A}\,,$$
in which the scalar part equals the electric potential ϕ, and the vector part the magnetic potential A. The electromagnetic field is then also:
$$F =   \partial \widetilde{A} .$$
The field can be split into electric
$$E = \langle  \partial \widetilde{A} \rangle_1$$
and magnetic
$$B = i \langle  \partial \widetilde{A} \rangle_2$$
components. Here,
$$\partial = \partial_t + \mathbf{e}_1 \, \partial_x + \mathbf{e}_2 \, \partial_y + \mathbf{e}_3 \, \partial_z$$
and F is invariant under a gauge transformation of the form
$$A \rightarrow A + \partial \chi \,,$$
where $\chi$ is a scalar field.

The electromagnetic field is covariant under Lorentz transformations according to the law
$$F \rightarrow F^\prime = \Lambda F  \widetilde{\Lambda}\,.$$
This transformation law can be easily derived from the isomorphism between the APS and the even subalgebra of the STA.

=== Maxwell's equations and the Lorentz force ===
The Maxwell equations can be expressed in a single equation:
$$\partial F = \frac{1}{ \varepsilon_0} \widetilde{J}\,.$$
The Lorentz force equation takes the form
$$\frac{d p}{d \tau} = e \langle F u \rangle_{0\oplus1}=e \langle F u \rangle_{0}+e \langle F u \rangle_{1}\,.$$

=== Electromagnetic Lagrangian ===
The electromagnetic Lagrangian is
$$L = \frac{1}{2} \langle F F \rangle_{0\oplus3} - \langle A \widetilde{J} \rangle_{0\oplus3}\,,$$
which is a real scalar invariant.

== Relativistic quantum mechanics ==
The Dirac equation, for an electrically charged particle of mass m and charge e, takes the form:
$$i \widetilde{\partial} \Psi\mathbf{e}_3  + e \widetilde{A} \Psi = m \Psi^- ,$$
where e_{3} is an arbitrary unitary vector (which functions as a reference axis), and A is the electromagnetic paravector potential as above. The electromagnetic interaction has been included via minimal coupling in terms of the potential A.

== Lorentz rotor & velocity ==
Note:

The differential equation of the Lorentz rotor that is consistent with the Lorentz force is
$$\frac{d \Lambda}{ d \tau} = \frac{e}{2mc} F \Lambda,$$
such that the proper velocity is calculated as the Lorentz transformation of the proper velocity at rest
$$u = \Lambda \Lambda^\dagger,$$
which can be integrated to find the space-time trajectory $x(\tau)$ with the additional use of
$$\frac{d x}{ d \tau} = u .$$

== See also ==
- Paravector
- Multivector
- wikibooks:Physics Using Geometric Algebra
- Dirac equation in the algebra of physical space
- Algebra
