= Paravector =

Sum of a scalar and vector in Clifford algebra

The name paravector is used for the combination of a scalar and a vector in any Clifford algebra, known as geometric algebra among physicists.

This name was given by J. G. Maks in a doctoral dissertation at Technische Universiteit Delft, Netherlands, in 1989.

The complete algebra of paravectors along with corresponding higher grade generalizations, all in the context of the Euclidean space of three dimensions, is an alternative approach to the spacetime algebra (STA) introduced by David Hestenes. This alternative algebra is called algebra of physical space (APS).

== Fundamental axiom ==
For Euclidean spaces, the fundamental axiom indicates that the product of a vector with itself is the scalar value of the length squared (positive)

$$\mathbf{v} \mathbf{v} = \mathbf{v}\cdot \mathbf{v}$$

Writing

$$\mathbf{v} = \mathbf{u} + \mathbf{w},$$

and introducing this into the expression of the fundamental axiom

$$(\mathbf{u} + \mathbf{w})^2
= \mathbf{u} \mathbf{u} +
\mathbf{u} \mathbf{w} + \mathbf{w} \mathbf{u} +
\mathbf{w} \mathbf{w},$$

we get the following expression after appealing to the fundamental axiom again

$$\mathbf{u} \cdot \mathbf{u}  +
2 \mathbf{u} \cdot \mathbf{w} +
\mathbf{w} \cdot \mathbf{w}
= \mathbf{u} \cdot \mathbf{u} +
\mathbf{u} \mathbf{w} + \mathbf{w} \mathbf{u} +
\mathbf{w} \cdot \mathbf{w},$$

which allows to identify the scalar product of two vectors as

$$\mathbf{u} \cdot \mathbf{w} =
\frac{1}{2}\left( \mathbf{u} \mathbf{w} + \mathbf{w} \mathbf{u} \right).$$

As an important consequence we conclude that two orthogonal vectors (with zero scalar product) anticommute

$$\mathbf{u} \mathbf{w} + \mathbf{w} \mathbf{u}  =  0$$

== The three-dimensional Euclidean space ==
The following list represents an instance of a complete basis for the $C\ell_3$space,

$$\{  1 , \{ \mathbf{e}_1,\mathbf{e}_2,\mathbf{e}_3 \} , \{ \mathbf{e}_{23},\mathbf{e}_{31},\mathbf{e}_{12} \} , \mathbf{e}_{123}  \},$$

which forms an eight-dimensional space, where the multiple indices indicate the product of the respective basis vectors, for example

$$\mathbf{e}_{23} =  \mathbf{e}_2 \mathbf{e}_3  .$$

The grade of a basis element is defined in terms of the vector multiplicity, such that

Grade	Type	Basis element/s
0	Unitary real scalar	$1$
1	Vector	$\{ \mathbf{e}_1,\mathbf{e}_2,\mathbf{e}_3 \}$
2	Bivector	$\{ \mathbf{e}_{23},\mathbf{e}_{31},\mathbf{e}_{12} \}$
3	Trivector volume element	$\mathbf{e}_{123}$

According to the fundamental axiom, two different basis vectors anticommute,

$$\mathbf{e}_i \mathbf{e}_j + \mathbf{e}_j \mathbf{e}_i   = 2 \delta_{ij}$$

or in other words,

$$\mathbf{e}_i \mathbf{e}_j = - \mathbf{e}_j \mathbf{e}_i \,\,; i \neq j$$

This means that the volume element $\mathbf{e}_{123}$ squares to $-1$

$$\mathbf{e}_{123}^2 =
\mathbf{e}_1 \mathbf{e}_2 \mathbf{e}_3 \mathbf{e}_1 \mathbf{e}_2 \mathbf{e}_3 =
\mathbf{e}_2 \mathbf{e}_3 \mathbf{e}_2 \mathbf{e}_3 =
- \mathbf{e}_3 \mathbf{e}_3 = -1.$$

Moreover, the volume element $\mathbf{e}_{123}$ commutes with any other element of the $C\ell(3)$ algebra, so that it can be identified with the complex number $i$, whenever there is no danger of confusion. In fact, the volume element $\mathbf{e}_{123}$ along with the real scalar forms an algebra isomorphic to the standard complex algebra. The volume element can be used to rewrite an equivalent form of the basis as

Grade	Type	Basis element/s
0	Unitary real scalar	$1$
1	Vector	$\{ \mathbf{e}_1,\mathbf{e}_2,\mathbf{e}_3 \}$
2	Bivector	$\{ i \mathbf{e}_{1}, i \mathbf{e}_{2}, i \mathbf{e}_{3} \}$
3	Trivector volume element	$i$

=== Paravectors ===
The corresponding paravector basis that combines a real scalar and vectors is

$$\{  1 , \mathbf{e}_1,\mathbf{e}_2,\mathbf{e}_3 \}$$,

which forms a four-dimensional linear space. The paravector space in the three-dimensional Euclidean space $C\ell_3$ can be used to represent the space-time of special relativity as expressed in the algebra of physical space (APS).

It is convenient to write the unit scalar as $1=\mathbf{e}_0$, so that the complete basis can be written in a compact form as

$$\{ \mathbf{e}_\mu  \},$$

where the Greek indices such as $\mu$ run from $0$ to $3$.

=== Antiautomorphism ===
==== Reversion conjugation ====
The Reversion antiautomorphism is denoted by $\dagger$. The action of this conjugation is to reverse the order of the geometric product (product between Clifford numbers in general).

$$(AB)^\dagger = B^\dagger A^\dagger$$,

where vectors and real scalar numbers are invariant under reversion conjugation and are said to be real, for example:

$$\mathbf{a}^\dagger = \mathbf{a}$$

$$1^\dagger = 1$$

On the other hand, the trivector and bivectors change sign under reversion conjugation and are said to be purely imaginary. The reversion conjugation applied to each basis element is given below

Element	Reversion conjugation
$1$	$1$
$\mathbf{e}_1$	$\mathbf{e}_1$
$\mathbf{e}_2$	$\mathbf{e}_2$
$\mathbf{e}_3$	$\mathbf{e}_3$
$\mathbf{e}_{12}$	$-\mathbf{e}_{12}$
$\mathbf{e}_{23}$	$-\mathbf{e}_{23}$
$\mathbf{e}_{31}$	$-\mathbf{e}_{31}$
$\mathbf{e}_{123}$	$-\mathbf{e}_{123}$

==== Clifford conjugation ====
The Clifford Conjugation is denoted by a bar over the object $\bar{ }$. This conjugation is also called bar conjugation.

Clifford conjugation is the combined action of grade involution and reversion.

The action of the Clifford conjugation on a paravector is to reverse the sign of the vectors, maintaining the sign of the real scalar numbers, for example

$$\bar{\mathbf{a}} = -\mathbf{a}$$
$$\bar{1} = 1$$

This is due to both scalars and vectors being invariant to reversion ( it is impossible to reverse the order of one or no things ) and scalars are of zero order and so are of even grade whilst vectors are of odd grade and so undergo a sign change under grade involution.

As antiautomorphism, the Clifford conjugation is distributed as

$$\overline{AB} = \overline{B} \,\, \overline{A}$$

The bar conjugation applied to each basis element is given below

Element	Bar conjugation
$1$	$1$
$\mathbf{e}_1$	$-\mathbf{e}_1$
$\mathbf{e}_2$	$-\mathbf{e}_2$
$\mathbf{e}_3$	$-\mathbf{e}_3$
$\mathbf{e}_{12}$	$-\mathbf{e}_{12}$
$\mathbf{e}_{23}$	$-\mathbf{e}_{23}$
$\mathbf{e}_{31}$	$-\mathbf{e}_{31}$
$\mathbf{e}_{123}$	$\mathbf{e}_{123}$

- Note.- The volume element is invariant under the bar conjugation.

=== Grade automorphism ===
The grade automorphism

$$\overline{A B}^\dagger = \overline{A}^\dagger \overline{B}^\dagger$$

is defined as the inversion of the sign of odd-grade multivectors, while maintaining the even-grade multivectors invariant:

Element	Grade involution
$1$	$1$
$\mathbf{e}_1$	$-\mathbf{e}_1$
$\mathbf{e}_2$	$-\mathbf{e}_2$
$\mathbf{e}_3$	$-\mathbf{e}_3$
$\mathbf{e}_{12}$	$\mathbf{e}_{12}$
$\mathbf{e}_{23}$	$\mathbf{e}_{23}$
$\mathbf{e}_{31}$	$\mathbf{e}_{31}$
$\mathbf{e}_{123}$	$-\mathbf{e}_{123}$

=== Invariant subspaces according to the conjugations ===
Four special subspaces can be defined in the $C\ell_3$ space based on their symmetries under the reversion and Clifford conjugation

- Scalar subspace: Invariant under Clifford conjugation.
- Vector subspace: Reverses sign under Clifford conjugation.
- Real subspace: Invariant under reversion conjugation.
- Imaginary subspace: Reverses sign under reversion conjugation.

Given $p$ as a general Clifford number, the complementary scalar and vector parts of $p$ are given by symmetric and antisymmetric combinations with the Clifford conjugation

$$\langle p \rangle_S = \frac{1}{2}(p  + \overline{p}),$$
$$\langle p \rangle_V = \frac{1}{2}(p  - \overline{p})$$.

In similar way, the complementary Real and Imaginary parts of $p$ are given by symmetric and antisymmetric combinations with the Reversion conjugation

$$\langle p \rangle_R = \frac{1}{2}(p  + p^\dagger),$$
$$\langle p \rangle_I = \frac{1}{2}(p  - p^\dagger)$$.

It is possible to define four intersections, listed below

$$\langle p \rangle_{RS} = \langle p \rangle_{SR}  \equiv \langle \langle p \rangle_R \rangle_S$$
$$\langle p \rangle_{RV} = \langle p \rangle_{VR}  \equiv \langle \langle p \rangle_R \rangle_V$$
$$\langle p \rangle_{IV} = \langle p \rangle_{VI}  \equiv \langle \langle p \rangle_I \rangle_V$$
$$\langle p \rangle_{IS} = \langle p \rangle_{SI}  \equiv \langle \langle p \rangle_I \rangle_S$$

The following table summarizes the grades of the respective subspaces, where for example, the grade 0 can be seen as the intersection of the Real and Scalar subspaces

	Real	Imaginary
Scalar	0	3
Vector	1	2

- Remark: The term "Imaginary" is used in the context of the $C\ell_3$ algebra and does not imply the introduction of the standard complex numbers in any form.

=== Closed subspaces with respect to the product ===
There are two subspaces that are closed with respect to the product. They are the scalar space and the even space that are isomorphic with the well known algebras of complex numbers and quaternions.

- The scalar space made of grades 0 and 3 is isomorphic with the standard algebra of complex numbers with the identification of
  $$\mathbf{e}_{123} =  i.$$
- The even space, made of elements of grades 0 and 2, is isomorphic with the algebra of quaternions with the identification of
  $$-\mathbf{e}_{23} = i$$
  $$-\mathbf{e}_{31} = j$$
  $$-\mathbf{e}_{12} = k.$$

=== Scalar product ===
Given two paravectors $u$ and $v$, the generalization of the scalar product is

$$\langle u \bar{v} \rangle_S.$$

The magnitude square of a paravector $u$ is

$$\langle u \bar{u} \rangle_S,$$

which is not a definite bilinear form and can be equal to zero even if the paravector is not equal to zero.

It is very suggestive that the paravector space automatically obeys the metric of the Minkowski space because

$$\eta_{\mu\nu} = \langle \mathbf{e}_\mu \bar{\mathbf{e}}_\nu  \rangle_S$$

and in particular:

$$\eta_{00} = \langle \mathbf{e}_0 \bar{\mathbf{e}}_0  \rangle =
\langle 1 (1)  \rangle_S = 1,$$
$$\eta_{11} = \langle \mathbf{e}_1 \bar{\mathbf{e}}_1  \rangle =
\langle  \mathbf{e}_1 (-\mathbf{e}_1)  \rangle_S = - 1,$$
$$\eta_{01} = \langle \mathbf{e}_0 \bar{\mathbf{e}}_1  \rangle =
\langle 1 (-\mathbf{e}_1)  \rangle_S = 0.$$

=== Biparavectors ===
Given two paravectors $u$ and $v$, the biparavector B is defined as:

$$B = \langle u \bar{v} \rangle_V$$.

The biparavector basis can be written as

$$\{ \langle \mathbf{e}_\mu \bar{\mathbf{e}}_\nu \rangle_V  \},$$

which contains six independent elements, including real and imaginary terms. Three real elements (vectors) as

$$\langle \mathbf{e}_0 \bar{\mathbf{e}}_k \rangle_V = -\mathbf{e}_k ,$$

and three imaginary elements (bivectors) as

$$\langle \mathbf{e}_j \bar{\mathbf{e}}_k \rangle_V = -\mathbf{e}_{jk}$$

where $j,k$ run from 1 to 3.

In the Algebra of physical space, the electromagnetic field is expressed as a biparavector as

$$F = \mathbf{E} + i \mathbf{B}^{\,},$$

where both the electric and magnetic fields are real vectors

$$\mathbf{E}^\dagger = \mathbf{E}$$
$$\mathbf{B}^\dagger = \mathbf{B}$$

and $i$ represents the pseudoscalar volume element.

Another example of biparavector is the representation of the space-time rotation rate that can be expressed as

$$W = i \theta^j \mathbf{e}_j +  \eta^j \mathbf{e}_j,$$

with three ordinary rotation angle variables $\theta^j$ and three rapidities $\eta^j$.

=== Triparavectors ===
Given three paravectors $u$, $v$ and $w$, the triparavector T is defined as:

$$T = \langle u \bar{v} w \rangle_I$$.

The triparavector basis can be written as

$$\{ \langle \mathbf{e}_\mu \bar{\mathbf{e}}_\nu \mathbf{e}_{\lambda} \rangle_I  \},$$

but there are only four independent triparavectors, so it can be reduced to

$$\{ i \mathbf{e}_{\rho}  \}$$.

=== Pseudoscalar ===
The pseudoscalar basis is

$$\{ \langle \mathbf{e}_\mu \bar{\mathbf{e}}_\nu \mathbf{e}_{\lambda}
\bar{\mathbf{e}}_{\rho}\rangle_{IS}  \},$$

but a calculation reveals that it contains only a single term. This term is the volume element $i = \mathbf{e}_1 \mathbf{e}_2 \mathbf{e}_3$.

The four grades, taken in combination of pairs generate the paravector, biparavector and triparavector spaces as shown in the next table, where for example, we see that the paravector is made of grades 0 and 1

	1	3
0	Paravector	Scalar/Pseudoscalar
2	Biparavector	Triparavector

=== Paragradient ===
The paragradient operator is the generalization of the gradient operator in the paravector space. The paragradient in the standard paravector basis is

$$\partial = \mathbf{e}_0 \partial_0 - \mathbf{e}_1 \partial_1 - \mathbf{e}_2 \partial_2 - \mathbf{e}_3 \partial_3,$$

which allows one to write the d'Alembert operator as

$$\square =  \langle \bar{\partial} \partial \rangle_S =  \langle \partial \bar{\partial} \rangle_S$$

The standard gradient operator can be defined naturally as

$$\nabla = \mathbf{e}_1 \partial_1 + \mathbf{e}_2 \partial_2 + \mathbf{e}_3 \partial_3,$$

so that the paragradient can be written as

$$\partial = \partial_0 - \nabla,$$

where $\mathbf{e}_0 = 1$.

The application of the paragradient operator must be done carefully, always respecting its non-commutative nature. For example, a widely used derivative is

$$\partial e^{ f(x) \mathbf{e}_3 } =
(\partial f(x)) e^{ f(x) \mathbf{e}_3 } \mathbf{e}_3,$$

where $f(x)$ is a scalar function of the coordinates.

The paragradient is an operator that always acts from the left if the function is a scalar function. However, if the function is not scalar, the paragradient can act from the right as well. For example, the following expression is expanded as

$$(L \partial) =
\mathbf{e}_0 \partial_0 L +   (\partial_1 L) \mathbf{e}_1 +
(\partial_2 L)\mathbf{e}_2  +  (\partial_3 L) \mathbf{e}_3$$

=== Null paravectors as projectors ===
Null paravectors are elements that are not necessarily zero but have magnitude identical to zero. For a null paravector $p$, this property necessarily implies the following identity

$$p \bar{p} = 0.$$

In the context of Special Relativity they are also called lightlike paravectors.

Projectors are null paravectors of the form

$$P_{\mathbf k} = \frac{1}{2}( 1 + \hat{\mathbf k} ),$$

where $\hat{\mathbf k}$ is a unit vector.

A projector $P_{\mathbf k}$ of this form has a complementary projector $\bar{P}_{\mathbf k}$

$$\bar{P}_{\mathbf k} = \frac{1}{2}( 1 - \hat{\mathbf k} ),$$

such that

$$P_{\mathbf k} + \bar{P}_{\mathbf k} = 1$$

As projectors, they are idempotent

$$P_\mathbf{k} =  P_\mathbf{k} P_\mathbf{k} = P_\mathbf{k}P_\mathbf{k}P_\mathbf{k}=...$$

and the projection of one on the other is zero because they are null paravectors

$$P_{\mathbf k}  \bar{P}_{\mathbf k} = 0.$$

The associated unit vector of the projector can be extracted as

$$\hat{\mathbf{k}} = P_\mathbf{\mathbf{k}} - \bar{P}_{\mathbf{k}},$$

this means that $\hat{\mathbf{k}}$ is an operator with eigenfunctions $P_\mathbf{\mathbf{k}}$ and $\bar{P}_\mathbf{\mathbf{k}}$, with respective eigenvalues $1$ and $-1$.

From the previous result, the following identity is valid assuming that $f(\hat{\mathbf{k}})$ is analytic around zero

$$f( \hat{\mathbf{k}}) =  f(1) P_{\mathbf{k}}+f(-1) \bar{P}_{\mathbf{k}}.$$

This gives origin to the pacwoman property, such that the following identities are satisfied

$$f( \hat{\mathbf{k}}) P_{\mathbf{k}} =  f(1) P_{\mathbf{k}},$$
$$f( \hat{\mathbf{k}}) \bar{P}_{\mathbf{k}} =  f(-1) \bar{P}_{\mathbf{k}}.$$

=== Null basis for the paravector space ===
A basis of elements, each one of them null, can be constructed for the complete $C\ell_3$ space. The basis of interest is the following

$$\{ \bar{P}_3, P_3 \mathbf{e}_1, P_3,  \mathbf{e}_1 P_3 \}$$

so that an arbitrary paravector

$$p = p^0 \mathbf{e}_0 + p^1 \mathbf{e}_1 + p^2 \mathbf{e}_2 + p^3 \mathbf{e}_3$$

can be written as

$$p = (p^0+p^3)P_3 +  (p^0 - p^3)\bar{P}_3  + (p^1+ip^2)\mathbf{e}_1 P_3 + (p^1-ip^2)P_3 \mathbf{e}_1$$

This representation is useful for some systems that are naturally expressed in terms of the light cone variables that are the coefficients of $P_3$ and $\bar{P}_3$ respectively.

Every expression in the paravector space can be written in terms of the null basis. A paravector $p$ is in general parametrized by two real scalars numbers $\{ u , v \}$ and a general scalar number $w$ (including scalar and pseudoscalar numbers)

$$p =  u \bar{P}_3 + v P_3  + w \mathbf{e}_1 P_3 + w^{\dagger}P_3 \mathbf{e}_1$$

the paragradient in the null basis is

$$\partial = 2P_3 \partial_u + 2\bar{P}_3 \partial_v -
2\mathbf{e}_1 P_3 \partial_{w^{\dagger}} - 2 P_3 \mathbf{e}_1 \partial_w$$

== Higher dimensions ==
An n-dimensional Euclidean space allows the existence of multivectors of grade n (n-vectors). The dimension of the vector space is evidently equal to n and a simple combinatorial analysis shows that the dimension of the bivector space is
$$\begin{pmatrix} n \\ 2 \end{pmatrix}$$
. In general, the dimension of the multivector space of grade m is
$$\begin{pmatrix} n \\ m \end{pmatrix}$$
and the dimension of the whole Clifford algebra $C\ell(n)$ is $2^n$.

A given multivector with homogeneous grade is either invariant or changes sign under the action of the reversion conjugation $\dagger$. The elements that remain invariant are defined as Hermitian and those that change sign are defined as anti-Hermitian. Grades can thus be classified as follows:

Grade	Classification
$0$	Hermitian
$1$	Hermitian
$2$	Anti-Hermitian
$3$	Anti-Hermitian
$4$	Hermitian
$5$	Hermitian
$6$	Anti-Hermitian
$7$	Anti-Hermitian
$\vdots$	$\vdots$

== Matrix representation ==
The algebra of the $C\ell(3)$ space is isomorphic to the Pauli matrix algebra such that

	Matrix representation 3D	Explicit matrix
$\mathbf{e}_0$	$\sigma_0^{ }$	$$\begin{pmatrix} 1 && 0 \\ 0 && 1 \end{pmatrix}$$
$\mathbf{e}_1$	$\sigma_1^{ }$	$$\begin{pmatrix} 0 && 1 \\ 1 && 0 \end{pmatrix}$$
$\mathbf{e}_2$	$\sigma_2^{ }$	$$\begin{pmatrix} 0 && -i \\ i && 0 \end{pmatrix}$$
$\mathbf{e}_3$	$\sigma_3^{ }$	$$\begin{pmatrix} 1 && 0 \\ 0 && -1 \end{pmatrix}$$

from which the null basis elements become

$${ P_3} =
\begin{pmatrix} 1 & 0 \\ 0 & 0  \end{pmatrix}  \,; \bar{ P}_3 =
\begin{pmatrix} 0 & 0 \\ 0 & 1  \end{pmatrix} \,;  { P_3} \mathbf{e}_1 =
\begin{pmatrix} 0 & 1 \\ 0 & 0  \end{pmatrix}
\,;\mathbf{e}_1 { P}_3 =
\begin{pmatrix} 0 & 0 \\ 1 & 0  \end{pmatrix}.$$

A general Clifford number in 3D can be written as

$$\Psi = \psi_{11} P_3 - \psi_{12} P_3 \mathbf{e}_1 + \psi_{21} \mathbf{e}_1 P_3 +
\psi_{22} \bar{P}_3,$$

where the coefficients $\psi_{jk}$ are scalar elements (including pseudoscalars). The indexes were chosen such that the representation of this Clifford number in terms of the Pauli matrices is

$$\Psi \rightarrow
\begin{pmatrix}
\psi_{11} & \psi_{12} \\ \psi_{21} & \psi_{22}
\end{pmatrix}$$

=== Conjugations ===
The reversion conjugation is translated into the Hermitian conjugation and the bar conjugation is translated into the following matrix:

$$\bar{\Psi} \rightarrow
\begin{pmatrix}
\psi_{22} & -\psi_{12} \\ -\psi_{21} & \psi_{11}
\end{pmatrix},$$

such that the scalar part is translated as

$$\langle \Psi \rangle_S \rightarrow
\frac{ \psi_{11} + \psi_{22} }{2}\begin{pmatrix}
1 & 0 \\  0 & 1
\end{pmatrix} = \frac{Tr[\psi]}{2} \mathbf{1}_{2\times 2}$$

The rest of the subspaces are translated as

$$\langle \Psi \rangle_V \rightarrow
\begin{pmatrix}
0 & \psi_{12} \\  \psi_{21} & 0
\end{pmatrix}$$
$$\langle \Psi \rangle_R \rightarrow
\frac{1}{2}
\begin{pmatrix}
\psi_{11}+\psi_{11}^* & \psi_{12}+\psi_{21}^* \\
\psi_{21}+\psi_{12}^* & \psi_{22}+\psi_{22}^*
\end{pmatrix}$$
$$\langle \Psi \rangle_I \rightarrow
\frac{1}{2}
\begin{pmatrix}
\psi_{11}-\psi_{11}^* & \psi_{12}-\psi_{21}^* \\
\psi_{21}-\psi_{12}^* & \psi_{22}-\psi_{22}^*
\end{pmatrix}$$

=== Higher dimensions ===
The matrix representation of a Euclidean space in higher dimensions can be constructed in terms of the Kronecker product of the Pauli matrices, resulting in complex matrices of dimension $2^n$. The 4D representation could be taken as

	Matrix representation 4D
$\mathbf{e}_1$	$\sigma_3 \otimes \sigma_1$
$\mathbf{e}_2$	$\sigma_3 \otimes \sigma_2$
$\mathbf{e}_3$	$\sigma_3 \otimes \sigma_3$
$\mathbf{e}_4$	$\sigma_2 \otimes \sigma_0$

The 7D representation could be taken as

	Matrix representation 7D
$\mathbf{e}_1$	$\sigma_0 \otimes \sigma_3 \otimes \sigma_1$
$\mathbf{e}_2$	$\sigma_0 \otimes \sigma_3 \otimes \sigma_2$
$\mathbf{e}_3$	$\sigma_0 \otimes \sigma_3 \otimes \sigma_3$
$\mathbf{e}_4$	$\sigma_0 \otimes \sigma_2 \otimes \sigma_0$
$\mathbf{e}_5$	$\sigma_3 \otimes \sigma_1 \otimes \sigma_0$
$\mathbf{e}_6$	$\sigma_1 \otimes \sigma_1 \otimes \sigma_0$
$\mathbf{e}_7$	$\sigma_2 \otimes \sigma_1 \otimes \sigma_0$

== Lie algebras ==
Clifford algebras can be used to represent any classical Lie algebra. In general it is possible to identify Lie algebras of compact groups by using anti-Hermitian elements, which can be extended to non-compact groups by adding Hermitian elements.

The bivectors of an n-dimensional Euclidean space are Hermitian elements and can be used to represent the $\mathrm{spin}(n)$ Lie algebra.

The bivectors of the three-dimensional Euclidean space form the $\mathrm{spin}(3)$ Lie algebra, which is isomorphic to the $\mathrm{su}(2)$ Lie algebra. This accidental isomorphism allows to picture a geometric interpretation of the states of the two dimensional Hilbert space by using the Bloch sphere. One of those systems is the spin 1/2 particle.

The $\mathrm{spin}(3)$ Lie algebra can be extended by adding the three unitary vectors to form a Lie algebra isomorphic to the $\mathrm{SL}(2,C)$ Lie algebra, which is the double cover of the Lorentz group $\mathrm{SO}(3,1)$. This isomorphism allows the possibility to develop a formalism of special relativity based on $\mathrm{SL}(2,C)$, which is carried out in the form of the algebra of physical space.

There is only one additional accidental isomorphism between a spin Lie algebra and a $\mathrm{su}(N)$ Lie algebra. This is the isomorphism between $\mathrm{spin}(6)$ and $\mathrm{su}(4)$.

Another interesting isomorphism exists between $\mathrm{spin}(5)$ and $\mathrm{sp}(4)$. So, the $\mathrm{sp}(4)$ Lie algebra can be used to generate the $USp(4)$ group. Despite that this group is smaller than the $\mathrm{SU}(4)$ group, it is seen to be enough to span the four-dimensional Hilbert space.

== See also ==
- Algebra of physical space
- Dirac equation in the algebra of physical space
